

183001–183100 

|-bgcolor=#fefefe
| 183001 ||  || — || August 10, 2002 || Socorro || LINEAR || NYS || align=right | 1.2 km || 
|-id=002 bgcolor=#fefefe
| 183002 ||  || — || August 9, 2002 || Socorro || LINEAR || — || align=right | 1.3 km || 
|-id=003 bgcolor=#fefefe
| 183003 ||  || — || August 9, 2002 || Socorro || LINEAR || FLO || align=right data-sort-value="0.95" | 950 m || 
|-id=004 bgcolor=#fefefe
| 183004 ||  || — || August 9, 2002 || Socorro || LINEAR || — || align=right | 1.5 km || 
|-id=005 bgcolor=#fefefe
| 183005 ||  || — || August 10, 2002 || Socorro || LINEAR || V || align=right | 1.2 km || 
|-id=006 bgcolor=#fefefe
| 183006 ||  || — || August 10, 2002 || Socorro || LINEAR || FLO || align=right | 1.0 km || 
|-id=007 bgcolor=#fefefe
| 183007 ||  || — || August 6, 2002 || Palomar || NEAT || — || align=right | 1.0 km || 
|-id=008 bgcolor=#fefefe
| 183008 ||  || — || August 11, 2002 || Palomar || NEAT || — || align=right | 1.3 km || 
|-id=009 bgcolor=#fefefe
| 183009 ||  || — || August 10, 2002 || Socorro || LINEAR || NYS || align=right data-sort-value="0.99" | 990 m || 
|-id=010 bgcolor=#fefefe
| 183010 ||  || — || August 10, 2002 || Socorro || LINEAR || FLO || align=right | 1.2 km || 
|-id=011 bgcolor=#fefefe
| 183011 ||  || — || August 12, 2002 || Socorro || LINEAR || FLO || align=right data-sort-value="0.84" | 840 m || 
|-id=012 bgcolor=#E9E9E9
| 183012 ||  || — || August 12, 2002 || Socorro || LINEAR || MIS || align=right | 3.7 km || 
|-id=013 bgcolor=#fefefe
| 183013 ||  || — || August 12, 2002 || Haleakala || NEAT || FLO || align=right | 1.0 km || 
|-id=014 bgcolor=#fefefe
| 183014 ||  || — || August 14, 2002 || Socorro || LINEAR || — || align=right | 1.4 km || 
|-id=015 bgcolor=#E9E9E9
| 183015 ||  || — || August 14, 2002 || Palomar || NEAT || — || align=right | 3.5 km || 
|-id=016 bgcolor=#fefefe
| 183016 ||  || — || August 11, 2002 || Haleakala || NEAT || — || align=right | 1.1 km || 
|-id=017 bgcolor=#fefefe
| 183017 ||  || — || August 11, 2002 || Haleakala || NEAT || ERI || align=right | 4.5 km || 
|-id=018 bgcolor=#fefefe
| 183018 ||  || — || August 12, 2002 || Haleakala || NEAT || — || align=right | 1.2 km || 
|-id=019 bgcolor=#fefefe
| 183019 ||  || — || August 14, 2002 || Socorro || LINEAR || NYS || align=right data-sort-value="0.90" | 900 m || 
|-id=020 bgcolor=#FA8072
| 183020 ||  || — || August 14, 2002 || Socorro || LINEAR || — || align=right | 1.4 km || 
|-id=021 bgcolor=#fefefe
| 183021 ||  || — || August 14, 2002 || Socorro || LINEAR || FLO || align=right | 1.0 km || 
|-id=022 bgcolor=#fefefe
| 183022 ||  || — || August 13, 2002 || Socorro || LINEAR || V || align=right data-sort-value="0.99" | 990 m || 
|-id=023 bgcolor=#FA8072
| 183023 ||  || — || August 13, 2002 || Socorro || LINEAR || — || align=right data-sort-value="0.98" | 980 m || 
|-id=024 bgcolor=#fefefe
| 183024 ||  || — || August 14, 2002 || Socorro || LINEAR || — || align=right | 1.4 km || 
|-id=025 bgcolor=#fefefe
| 183025 ||  || — || August 14, 2002 || Anderson Mesa || LONEOS || — || align=right | 1.4 km || 
|-id=026 bgcolor=#fefefe
| 183026 ||  || — || August 14, 2002 || Socorro || LINEAR || — || align=right | 1.3 km || 
|-id=027 bgcolor=#fefefe
| 183027 ||  || — || August 14, 2002 || Socorro || LINEAR || FLO || align=right data-sort-value="0.91" | 910 m || 
|-id=028 bgcolor=#d6d6d6
| 183028 ||  || — || August 13, 2002 || Bergisch Gladbach || W. Bickel || — || align=right | 3.3 km || 
|-id=029 bgcolor=#E9E9E9
| 183029 ||  || — || August 14, 2002 || Siding Spring || R. H. McNaught || — || align=right | 4.0 km || 
|-id=030 bgcolor=#fefefe
| 183030 ||  || — || August 6, 2002 || Palomar || NEAT || — || align=right data-sort-value="0.98" | 980 m || 
|-id=031 bgcolor=#fefefe
| 183031 ||  || — || August 8, 2002 || Palomar || S. F. Hönig || — || align=right | 1.00 km || 
|-id=032 bgcolor=#fefefe
| 183032 ||  || — || August 8, 2002 || Palomar || NEAT || NYS || align=right data-sort-value="0.81" | 810 m || 
|-id=033 bgcolor=#fefefe
| 183033 ||  || — || August 8, 2002 || Palomar || NEAT || — || align=right data-sort-value="0.87" | 870 m || 
|-id=034 bgcolor=#E9E9E9
| 183034 ||  || — || August 11, 2002 || Palomar || NEAT || — || align=right | 3.4 km || 
|-id=035 bgcolor=#fefefe
| 183035 || 2002 QY || — || August 16, 2002 || Palomar || NEAT || — || align=right | 1.3 km || 
|-id=036 bgcolor=#fefefe
| 183036 ||  || — || August 27, 2002 || Palomar || NEAT || NYS || align=right | 1.2 km || 
|-id=037 bgcolor=#E9E9E9
| 183037 ||  || — || August 27, 2002 || Palomar || NEAT || — || align=right | 1.1 km || 
|-id=038 bgcolor=#fefefe
| 183038 ||  || — || August 27, 2002 || Palomar || NEAT || — || align=right data-sort-value="0.97" | 970 m || 
|-id=039 bgcolor=#fefefe
| 183039 ||  || — || August 28, 2002 || Palomar || NEAT || FLO || align=right | 1.0 km || 
|-id=040 bgcolor=#E9E9E9
| 183040 ||  || — || August 16, 2002 || Palomar || A. Lowe || — || align=right | 3.2 km || 
|-id=041 bgcolor=#fefefe
| 183041 ||  || — || August 29, 2002 || Palomar || R. Matson || — || align=right data-sort-value="0.89" | 890 m || 
|-id=042 bgcolor=#fefefe
| 183042 ||  || — || August 29, 2002 || Palomar || S. F. Hönig || NYS || align=right | 1.0 km || 
|-id=043 bgcolor=#fefefe
| 183043 ||  || — || August 28, 2002 || Palomar || NEAT || — || align=right data-sort-value="0.69" | 690 m || 
|-id=044 bgcolor=#fefefe
| 183044 ||  || — || August 30, 2002 || Palomar || NEAT || FLO || align=right data-sort-value="0.88" | 880 m || 
|-id=045 bgcolor=#fefefe
| 183045 ||  || — || August 20, 2002 || Palomar || NEAT || V || align=right data-sort-value="0.90" | 900 m || 
|-id=046 bgcolor=#fefefe
| 183046 ||  || — || August 26, 2002 || Palomar || NEAT || — || align=right data-sort-value="0.94" | 940 m || 
|-id=047 bgcolor=#fefefe
| 183047 ||  || — || August 18, 2002 || Palomar || NEAT || — || align=right data-sort-value="0.99" | 990 m || 
|-id=048 bgcolor=#E9E9E9
| 183048 ||  || — || August 29, 2002 || Palomar || NEAT || — || align=right | 1.7 km || 
|-id=049 bgcolor=#fefefe
| 183049 ||  || — || August 27, 2002 || Palomar || NEAT || — || align=right | 1.1 km || 
|-id=050 bgcolor=#fefefe
| 183050 ||  || — || August 18, 2002 || Palomar || NEAT || — || align=right | 1.1 km || 
|-id=051 bgcolor=#fefefe
| 183051 ||  || — || August 28, 2002 || Palomar || NEAT || NYS || align=right data-sort-value="0.90" | 900 m || 
|-id=052 bgcolor=#fefefe
| 183052 ||  || — || August 29, 2002 || Palomar || NEAT || — || align=right | 1.1 km || 
|-id=053 bgcolor=#fefefe
| 183053 ||  || — || August 16, 2002 || Nanchuan || Q.-z. Ye || — || align=right | 1.4 km || 
|-id=054 bgcolor=#fefefe
| 183054 ||  || — || August 27, 2002 || Palomar || NEAT || NYS || align=right data-sort-value="0.69" | 690 m || 
|-id=055 bgcolor=#fefefe
| 183055 ||  || — || August 18, 2002 || Palomar || NEAT || V || align=right data-sort-value="0.81" | 810 m || 
|-id=056 bgcolor=#E9E9E9
| 183056 ||  || — || August 19, 2002 || Palomar || NEAT || — || align=right | 1.2 km || 
|-id=057 bgcolor=#fefefe
| 183057 ||  || — || August 29, 2002 || Palomar || NEAT || — || align=right | 1.0 km || 
|-id=058 bgcolor=#fefefe
| 183058 ||  || — || August 18, 2002 || Palomar || NEAT || — || align=right | 1.0 km || 
|-id=059 bgcolor=#fefefe
| 183059 ||  || — || August 29, 2002 || Palomar || NEAT || — || align=right | 1.0 km || 
|-id=060 bgcolor=#fefefe
| 183060 ||  || — || August 17, 2002 || Palomar || NEAT || NYS || align=right data-sort-value="0.88" | 880 m || 
|-id=061 bgcolor=#fefefe
| 183061 ||  || — || August 27, 2002 || Palomar || NEAT || — || align=right | 1.4 km || 
|-id=062 bgcolor=#fefefe
| 183062 ||  || — || August 18, 2002 || Palomar || NEAT || — || align=right | 1.1 km || 
|-id=063 bgcolor=#fefefe
| 183063 ||  || — || August 17, 2002 || Haleakala || NEAT || — || align=right | 1.3 km || 
|-id=064 bgcolor=#fefefe
| 183064 ||  || — || August 17, 2002 || Palomar || NEAT || MAS || align=right | 1.1 km || 
|-id=065 bgcolor=#E9E9E9
| 183065 ||  || — || August 16, 2002 || Palomar || NEAT || PAD || align=right | 2.1 km || 
|-id=066 bgcolor=#fefefe
| 183066 ||  || — || September 1, 2002 || Haleakala || NEAT || V || align=right data-sort-value="0.94" | 940 m || 
|-id=067 bgcolor=#fefefe
| 183067 ||  || — || September 4, 2002 || Anderson Mesa || LONEOS || FLO || align=right | 1.3 km || 
|-id=068 bgcolor=#fefefe
| 183068 ||  || — || September 4, 2002 || Anderson Mesa || LONEOS || MAS || align=right | 1.1 km || 
|-id=069 bgcolor=#FA8072
| 183069 ||  || — || September 4, 2002 || Anderson Mesa || LONEOS || — || align=right | 1.1 km || 
|-id=070 bgcolor=#fefefe
| 183070 ||  || — || September 4, 2002 || Anderson Mesa || LONEOS || — || align=right | 2.7 km || 
|-id=071 bgcolor=#E9E9E9
| 183071 ||  || — || September 4, 2002 || Anderson Mesa || LONEOS || MIS || align=right | 4.0 km || 
|-id=072 bgcolor=#fefefe
| 183072 ||  || — || September 5, 2002 || Socorro || LINEAR || — || align=right | 1.5 km || 
|-id=073 bgcolor=#fefefe
| 183073 ||  || — || September 5, 2002 || Socorro || LINEAR || — || align=right | 1.6 km || 
|-id=074 bgcolor=#fefefe
| 183074 ||  || — || September 5, 2002 || Socorro || LINEAR || NYS || align=right | 1.0 km || 
|-id=075 bgcolor=#fefefe
| 183075 ||  || — || September 5, 2002 || Socorro || LINEAR || — || align=right | 1.2 km || 
|-id=076 bgcolor=#fefefe
| 183076 ||  || — || September 5, 2002 || Socorro || LINEAR || — || align=right | 1.0 km || 
|-id=077 bgcolor=#fefefe
| 183077 ||  || — || September 5, 2002 || Socorro || LINEAR || V || align=right | 1.3 km || 
|-id=078 bgcolor=#fefefe
| 183078 ||  || — || September 5, 2002 || Socorro || LINEAR || FLO || align=right | 1.3 km || 
|-id=079 bgcolor=#fefefe
| 183079 ||  || — || September 5, 2002 || Socorro || LINEAR || NYS || align=right | 1.1 km || 
|-id=080 bgcolor=#fefefe
| 183080 ||  || — || September 5, 2002 || Socorro || LINEAR || V || align=right | 1.2 km || 
|-id=081 bgcolor=#fefefe
| 183081 ||  || — || September 5, 2002 || Socorro || LINEAR || NYS || align=right | 1.2 km || 
|-id=082 bgcolor=#fefefe
| 183082 ||  || — || September 5, 2002 || Socorro || LINEAR || FLO || align=right | 1.2 km || 
|-id=083 bgcolor=#fefefe
| 183083 ||  || — || September 5, 2002 || Socorro || LINEAR || — || align=right | 1.3 km || 
|-id=084 bgcolor=#fefefe
| 183084 ||  || — || September 5, 2002 || Anderson Mesa || LONEOS || V || align=right | 1.1 km || 
|-id=085 bgcolor=#fefefe
| 183085 ||  || — || September 5, 2002 || Anderson Mesa || LONEOS || fast? || align=right | 1.4 km || 
|-id=086 bgcolor=#fefefe
| 183086 ||  || — || September 5, 2002 || Socorro || LINEAR || — || align=right | 1.1 km || 
|-id=087 bgcolor=#fefefe
| 183087 ||  || — || September 5, 2002 || Socorro || LINEAR || — || align=right | 1.2 km || 
|-id=088 bgcolor=#E9E9E9
| 183088 ||  || — || September 5, 2002 || Socorro || LINEAR || — || align=right | 1.2 km || 
|-id=089 bgcolor=#fefefe
| 183089 ||  || — || September 5, 2002 || Socorro || LINEAR || V || align=right data-sort-value="0.88" | 880 m || 
|-id=090 bgcolor=#fefefe
| 183090 ||  || — || September 5, 2002 || Socorro || LINEAR || CLA || align=right | 2.3 km || 
|-id=091 bgcolor=#fefefe
| 183091 ||  || — || September 5, 2002 || Socorro || LINEAR || NYS || align=right data-sort-value="0.94" | 940 m || 
|-id=092 bgcolor=#fefefe
| 183092 ||  || — || September 5, 2002 || Socorro || LINEAR || MAS || align=right | 1.0 km || 
|-id=093 bgcolor=#fefefe
| 183093 ||  || — || September 5, 2002 || Socorro || LINEAR || NYS || align=right | 1.0 km || 
|-id=094 bgcolor=#fefefe
| 183094 ||  || — || September 5, 2002 || Socorro || LINEAR || — || align=right | 1.2 km || 
|-id=095 bgcolor=#fefefe
| 183095 ||  || — || September 5, 2002 || Socorro || LINEAR || — || align=right | 1.1 km || 
|-id=096 bgcolor=#fefefe
| 183096 ||  || — || September 5, 2002 || Socorro || LINEAR || FLO || align=right | 1.9 km || 
|-id=097 bgcolor=#fefefe
| 183097 ||  || — || September 5, 2002 || Socorro || LINEAR || FLO || align=right | 1.0 km || 
|-id=098 bgcolor=#fefefe
| 183098 ||  || — || September 5, 2002 || Socorro || LINEAR || — || align=right | 1.0 km || 
|-id=099 bgcolor=#fefefe
| 183099 ||  || — || September 5, 2002 || Socorro || LINEAR || — || align=right | 1.3 km || 
|-id=100 bgcolor=#fefefe
| 183100 ||  || — || September 5, 2002 || Socorro || LINEAR || NYS || align=right | 1.3 km || 
|}

183101–183200 

|-bgcolor=#fefefe
| 183101 ||  || — || September 5, 2002 || Socorro || LINEAR || — || align=right | 1.0 km || 
|-id=102 bgcolor=#fefefe
| 183102 ||  || — || September 6, 2002 || Socorro || LINEAR || FLO || align=right | 1.3 km || 
|-id=103 bgcolor=#fefefe
| 183103 ||  || — || September 7, 2002 || Socorro || LINEAR || — || align=right | 1.0 km || 
|-id=104 bgcolor=#fefefe
| 183104 ||  || — || September 7, 2002 || Socorro || LINEAR || — || align=right | 1.3 km || 
|-id=105 bgcolor=#E9E9E9
| 183105 ||  || — || September 4, 2002 || Campo Imperatore || CINEOS || — || align=right | 3.1 km || 
|-id=106 bgcolor=#fefefe
| 183106 ||  || — || September 7, 2002 || Socorro || LINEAR || ERI || align=right | 2.6 km || 
|-id=107 bgcolor=#E9E9E9
| 183107 ||  || — || September 10, 2002 || Palomar || NEAT || MAR || align=right | 2.0 km || 
|-id=108 bgcolor=#fefefe
| 183108 ||  || — || September 10, 2002 || Haleakala || NEAT || FLO || align=right data-sort-value="0.87" | 870 m || 
|-id=109 bgcolor=#fefefe
| 183109 ||  || — || September 10, 2002 || Palomar || NEAT || V || align=right data-sort-value="0.96" | 960 m || 
|-id=110 bgcolor=#fefefe
| 183110 ||  || — || September 11, 2002 || Haleakala || NEAT || — || align=right | 1.5 km || 
|-id=111 bgcolor=#fefefe
| 183111 ||  || — || September 13, 2002 || Essen || Walter Hohmann Obs. || — || align=right | 1.6 km || 
|-id=112 bgcolor=#fefefe
| 183112 ||  || — || September 12, 2002 || Goodricke-Pigott || R. A. Tucker || FLO || align=right | 1.2 km || 
|-id=113 bgcolor=#d6d6d6
| 183113 ||  || — || September 10, 2002 || Palomar || NEAT || 3:2 || align=right | 11 km || 
|-id=114 bgcolor=#fefefe
| 183114 Vicques ||  ||  || September 13, 2002 || Vicques || M. Ory || — || align=right | 2.0 km || 
|-id=115 bgcolor=#fefefe
| 183115 ||  || — || September 11, 2002 || Palomar || NEAT || — || align=right | 1.1 km || 
|-id=116 bgcolor=#fefefe
| 183116 ||  || — || September 11, 2002 || Haleakala || NEAT || — || align=right data-sort-value="0.95" | 950 m || 
|-id=117 bgcolor=#fefefe
| 183117 ||  || — || September 11, 2002 || Palomar || NEAT || — || align=right | 1.3 km || 
|-id=118 bgcolor=#fefefe
| 183118 ||  || — || September 11, 2002 || Palomar || NEAT || NYS || align=right | 1.1 km || 
|-id=119 bgcolor=#E9E9E9
| 183119 ||  || — || September 12, 2002 || Palomar || NEAT || — || align=right | 1.1 km || 
|-id=120 bgcolor=#fefefe
| 183120 ||  || — || September 13, 2002 || Palomar || NEAT || — || align=right | 1.0 km || 
|-id=121 bgcolor=#fefefe
| 183121 ||  || — || September 13, 2002 || Palomar || NEAT || FLO || align=right data-sort-value="0.98" | 980 m || 
|-id=122 bgcolor=#fefefe
| 183122 ||  || — || September 13, 2002 || Palomar || NEAT || — || align=right | 1.1 km || 
|-id=123 bgcolor=#fefefe
| 183123 ||  || — || September 14, 2002 || Palomar || NEAT || — || align=right data-sort-value="0.87" | 870 m || 
|-id=124 bgcolor=#E9E9E9
| 183124 ||  || — || September 14, 2002 || Kitt Peak || Spacewatch || — || align=right | 1.6 km || 
|-id=125 bgcolor=#fefefe
| 183125 ||  || — || September 11, 2002 || Palomar || NEAT || — || align=right | 1.7 km || 
|-id=126 bgcolor=#d6d6d6
| 183126 ||  || — || September 12, 2002 || Palomar || NEAT || — || align=right | 4.0 km || 
|-id=127 bgcolor=#fefefe
| 183127 ||  || — || September 13, 2002 || Palomar || NEAT || — || align=right | 1.4 km || 
|-id=128 bgcolor=#fefefe
| 183128 ||  || — || September 13, 2002 || Socorro || LINEAR || — || align=right data-sort-value="0.94" | 940 m || 
|-id=129 bgcolor=#fefefe
| 183129 ||  || — || September 13, 2002 || Socorro || LINEAR || NYS || align=right data-sort-value="0.96" | 960 m || 
|-id=130 bgcolor=#fefefe
| 183130 ||  || — || September 13, 2002 || Socorro || LINEAR || — || align=right | 1.3 km || 
|-id=131 bgcolor=#E9E9E9
| 183131 ||  || — || September 13, 2002 || Palomar || NEAT || — || align=right | 3.3 km || 
|-id=132 bgcolor=#fefefe
| 183132 ||  || — || September 13, 2002 || Palomar || NEAT || — || align=right | 1.6 km || 
|-id=133 bgcolor=#fefefe
| 183133 ||  || — || September 13, 2002 || Haleakala || NEAT || NYS || align=right | 1.1 km || 
|-id=134 bgcolor=#E9E9E9
| 183134 ||  || — || September 15, 2002 || Kitt Peak || Spacewatch || — || align=right | 1.5 km || 
|-id=135 bgcolor=#fefefe
| 183135 ||  || — || September 15, 2002 || Haleakala || NEAT || — || align=right | 1.3 km || 
|-id=136 bgcolor=#E9E9E9
| 183136 ||  || — || September 13, 2002 || Anderson Mesa || LONEOS || — || align=right | 2.2 km || 
|-id=137 bgcolor=#fefefe
| 183137 ||  || — || September 15, 2002 || Palomar || NEAT || — || align=right | 1.2 km || 
|-id=138 bgcolor=#E9E9E9
| 183138 ||  || — || September 15, 2002 || Haleakala || NEAT || — || align=right | 4.3 km || 
|-id=139 bgcolor=#fefefe
| 183139 ||  || — || September 13, 2002 || Haleakala || NEAT || V || align=right data-sort-value="0.72" | 720 m || 
|-id=140 bgcolor=#fefefe
| 183140 ||  || — || September 15, 2002 || Haleakala || NEAT || — || align=right | 1.4 km || 
|-id=141 bgcolor=#E9E9E9
| 183141 ||  || — || September 14, 2002 || Palomar || NEAT || HOF || align=right | 3.9 km || 
|-id=142 bgcolor=#fefefe
| 183142 ||  || — || September 15, 2002 || Palomar || R. Matson || V || align=right data-sort-value="0.82" | 820 m || 
|-id=143 bgcolor=#fefefe
| 183143 ||  || — || September 14, 2002 || Palomar || R. Matson || — || align=right | 1.5 km || 
|-id=144 bgcolor=#fefefe
| 183144 ||  || — || September 14, 2002 || Palomar || R. Matson || — || align=right | 1.6 km || 
|-id=145 bgcolor=#fefefe
| 183145 ||  || — || September 14, 2002 || Palomar || NEAT || — || align=right | 1.1 km || 
|-id=146 bgcolor=#fefefe
| 183146 ||  || — || September 4, 2002 || Palomar || NEAT || FLO || align=right | 1.0 km || 
|-id=147 bgcolor=#fefefe
| 183147 ||  || — || September 12, 2002 || Palomar || NEAT || — || align=right | 1.3 km || 
|-id=148 bgcolor=#fefefe
| 183148 ||  || — || September 14, 2002 || Palomar || NEAT || V || align=right data-sort-value="0.64" | 640 m || 
|-id=149 bgcolor=#fefefe
| 183149 ||  || — || September 14, 2002 || Palomar || NEAT || NYS || align=right data-sort-value="0.80" | 800 m || 
|-id=150 bgcolor=#fefefe
| 183150 ||  || — || September 15, 2002 || Palomar || NEAT || MAS || align=right data-sort-value="0.82" | 820 m || 
|-id=151 bgcolor=#fefefe
| 183151 ||  || — || September 6, 2002 || Socorro || LINEAR || FLO || align=right | 1.0 km || 
|-id=152 bgcolor=#fefefe
| 183152 ||  || — || September 4, 2002 || Palomar || NEAT || — || align=right data-sort-value="0.95" | 950 m || 
|-id=153 bgcolor=#fefefe
| 183153 ||  || — || September 26, 2002 || Palomar || NEAT || V || align=right | 1.1 km || 
|-id=154 bgcolor=#E9E9E9
| 183154 ||  || — || September 26, 2002 || Pla D'Arguines || R. Ferrando || — || align=right | 1.3 km || 
|-id=155 bgcolor=#fefefe
| 183155 ||  || — || September 27, 2002 || Palomar || NEAT || — || align=right | 2.8 km || 
|-id=156 bgcolor=#fefefe
| 183156 ||  || — || September 27, 2002 || Palomar || NEAT || NYS || align=right | 1.1 km || 
|-id=157 bgcolor=#fefefe
| 183157 ||  || — || September 27, 2002 || Palomar || NEAT || — || align=right | 1.4 km || 
|-id=158 bgcolor=#fefefe
| 183158 ||  || — || September 27, 2002 || Palomar || NEAT || — || align=right | 1.5 km || 
|-id=159 bgcolor=#fefefe
| 183159 ||  || — || September 27, 2002 || Palomar || NEAT || — || align=right | 1.3 km || 
|-id=160 bgcolor=#fefefe
| 183160 ||  || — || September 27, 2002 || Palomar || NEAT || — || align=right | 1.2 km || 
|-id=161 bgcolor=#fefefe
| 183161 ||  || — || September 27, 2002 || Palomar || NEAT || — || align=right | 1.3 km || 
|-id=162 bgcolor=#fefefe
| 183162 ||  || — || September 26, 2002 || Palomar || NEAT || FLO || align=right | 1.2 km || 
|-id=163 bgcolor=#fefefe
| 183163 ||  || — || September 26, 2002 || Haleakala || NEAT || — || align=right | 1.4 km || 
|-id=164 bgcolor=#fefefe
| 183164 ||  || — || September 27, 2002 || Palomar || NEAT || — || align=right | 1.5 km || 
|-id=165 bgcolor=#fefefe
| 183165 ||  || — || September 27, 2002 || Anderson Mesa || LONEOS || FLO || align=right | 1.0 km || 
|-id=166 bgcolor=#fefefe
| 183166 ||  || — || September 28, 2002 || Haleakala || NEAT || — || align=right | 1.1 km || 
|-id=167 bgcolor=#fefefe
| 183167 ||  || — || September 28, 2002 || Haleakala || NEAT || V || align=right | 1.2 km || 
|-id=168 bgcolor=#fefefe
| 183168 ||  || — || September 29, 2002 || Haleakala || NEAT || — || align=right | 1.1 km || 
|-id=169 bgcolor=#fefefe
| 183169 ||  || — || September 29, 2002 || Haleakala || NEAT || NYS || align=right data-sort-value="0.98" | 980 m || 
|-id=170 bgcolor=#fefefe
| 183170 ||  || — || September 29, 2002 || Haleakala || NEAT || V || align=right | 1.1 km || 
|-id=171 bgcolor=#fefefe
| 183171 ||  || — || September 29, 2002 || Haleakala || NEAT || V || align=right | 1.1 km || 
|-id=172 bgcolor=#fefefe
| 183172 ||  || — || September 30, 2002 || Socorro || LINEAR || — || align=right | 1.7 km || 
|-id=173 bgcolor=#fefefe
| 183173 ||  || — || September 30, 2002 || Socorro || LINEAR || NYS || align=right | 1.1 km || 
|-id=174 bgcolor=#fefefe
| 183174 ||  || — || September 30, 2002 || Haleakala || NEAT || — || align=right | 1.3 km || 
|-id=175 bgcolor=#fefefe
| 183175 ||  || — || September 30, 2002 || Haleakala || NEAT || — || align=right | 1.0 km || 
|-id=176 bgcolor=#fefefe
| 183176 ||  || — || September 29, 2002 || Haleakala || NEAT || NYS || align=right data-sort-value="0.99" | 990 m || 
|-id=177 bgcolor=#fefefe
| 183177 ||  || — || September 30, 2002 || Socorro || LINEAR || — || align=right | 1.0 km || 
|-id=178 bgcolor=#fefefe
| 183178 ||  || — || September 30, 2002 || Socorro || LINEAR || — || align=right | 1.1 km || 
|-id=179 bgcolor=#fefefe
| 183179 ||  || — || September 30, 2002 || Socorro || LINEAR || FLO || align=right data-sort-value="0.99" | 990 m || 
|-id=180 bgcolor=#fefefe
| 183180 ||  || — || September 30, 2002 || Socorro || LINEAR || NYS || align=right | 1.1 km || 
|-id=181 bgcolor=#fefefe
| 183181 ||  || — || September 30, 2002 || Haleakala || NEAT || — || align=right | 1.3 km || 
|-id=182 bgcolor=#FA8072
| 183182 Weinheim ||  ||  || September 30, 2002 || Weinheim || L. Kurtze || — || align=right | 1.5 km || 
|-id=183 bgcolor=#fefefe
| 183183 ||  || — || September 16, 2002 || Haleakala || NEAT || PHO || align=right | 1.5 km || 
|-id=184 bgcolor=#fefefe
| 183184 ||  || — || September 30, 2002 || Socorro || LINEAR || V || align=right data-sort-value="0.92" | 920 m || 
|-id=185 bgcolor=#fefefe
| 183185 ||  || — || September 30, 2002 || Socorro || LINEAR || FLO || align=right | 1.0 km || 
|-id=186 bgcolor=#fefefe
| 183186 ||  || — || September 16, 2002 || Palomar || NEAT || V || align=right | 1.0 km || 
|-id=187 bgcolor=#fefefe
| 183187 ||  || — || September 16, 2002 || Palomar || NEAT || FLO || align=right data-sort-value="0.74" | 740 m || 
|-id=188 bgcolor=#fefefe
| 183188 ||  || — || September 16, 2002 || Palomar || NEAT || FLO || align=right data-sort-value="0.79" | 790 m || 
|-id=189 bgcolor=#fefefe
| 183189 ||  || — || September 26, 2002 || Palomar || NEAT || FLO || align=right data-sort-value="0.76" | 760 m || 
|-id=190 bgcolor=#E9E9E9
| 183190 ||  || — || September 26, 2002 || Palomar || NEAT || — || align=right data-sort-value="0.94" | 940 m || 
|-id=191 bgcolor=#E9E9E9
| 183191 ||  || — || September 16, 2002 || Haleakala || NEAT || EUN || align=right | 1.7 km || 
|-id=192 bgcolor=#fefefe
| 183192 ||  || — || October 1, 2002 || Socorro || LINEAR || NYS || align=right | 1.4 km || 
|-id=193 bgcolor=#fefefe
| 183193 ||  || — || October 1, 2002 || Socorro || LINEAR || ERI || align=right | 2.3 km || 
|-id=194 bgcolor=#fefefe
| 183194 ||  || — || October 1, 2002 || Socorro || LINEAR || V || align=right | 1.2 km || 
|-id=195 bgcolor=#fefefe
| 183195 ||  || — || October 1, 2002 || Anderson Mesa || LONEOS || — || align=right | 1.4 km || 
|-id=196 bgcolor=#fefefe
| 183196 ||  || — || October 1, 2002 || Anderson Mesa || LONEOS || — || align=right | 1.5 km || 
|-id=197 bgcolor=#fefefe
| 183197 ||  || — || October 2, 2002 || Socorro || LINEAR || V || align=right | 1.2 km || 
|-id=198 bgcolor=#fefefe
| 183198 ||  || — || October 1, 2002 || Anderson Mesa || LONEOS || NYS || align=right data-sort-value="0.88" | 880 m || 
|-id=199 bgcolor=#fefefe
| 183199 ||  || — || October 1, 2002 || Socorro || LINEAR || NYS || align=right | 1.2 km || 
|-id=200 bgcolor=#fefefe
| 183200 ||  || — || October 2, 2002 || Socorro || LINEAR || — || align=right | 1.4 km || 
|}

183201–183300 

|-bgcolor=#fefefe
| 183201 ||  || — || October 2, 2002 || Socorro || LINEAR || FLOfast? || align=right data-sort-value="0.94" | 940 m || 
|-id=202 bgcolor=#E9E9E9
| 183202 ||  || — || October 2, 2002 || Socorro || LINEAR || — || align=right | 2.8 km || 
|-id=203 bgcolor=#fefefe
| 183203 ||  || — || October 2, 2002 || Socorro || LINEAR || — || align=right | 1.2 km || 
|-id=204 bgcolor=#fefefe
| 183204 ||  || — || October 2, 2002 || Socorro || LINEAR || — || align=right | 1.3 km || 
|-id=205 bgcolor=#fefefe
| 183205 ||  || — || October 2, 2002 || Socorro || LINEAR || NYS || align=right data-sort-value="0.94" | 940 m || 
|-id=206 bgcolor=#fefefe
| 183206 ||  || — || October 2, 2002 || Socorro || LINEAR || — || align=right | 1.2 km || 
|-id=207 bgcolor=#fefefe
| 183207 ||  || — || October 2, 2002 || Socorro || LINEAR || NYS || align=right | 1.1 km || 
|-id=208 bgcolor=#fefefe
| 183208 ||  || — || October 2, 2002 || Socorro || LINEAR || NYS || align=right | 1.0 km || 
|-id=209 bgcolor=#fefefe
| 183209 ||  || — || October 2, 2002 || Socorro || LINEAR || V || align=right | 1.5 km || 
|-id=210 bgcolor=#fefefe
| 183210 ||  || — || October 2, 2002 || Socorro || LINEAR || MAS || align=right | 1.1 km || 
|-id=211 bgcolor=#fefefe
| 183211 ||  || — || October 2, 2002 || Socorro || LINEAR || NYS || align=right | 1.1 km || 
|-id=212 bgcolor=#fefefe
| 183212 ||  || — || October 2, 2002 || Socorro || LINEAR || FLO || align=right | 1.2 km || 
|-id=213 bgcolor=#fefefe
| 183213 ||  || — || October 2, 2002 || Socorro || LINEAR || V || align=right | 1.3 km || 
|-id=214 bgcolor=#fefefe
| 183214 ||  || — || October 2, 2002 || Socorro || LINEAR || SUL || align=right | 3.0 km || 
|-id=215 bgcolor=#E9E9E9
| 183215 ||  || — || October 2, 2002 || Socorro || LINEAR || — || align=right | 1.7 km || 
|-id=216 bgcolor=#fefefe
| 183216 ||  || — || October 2, 2002 || Socorro || LINEAR || V || align=right | 1.1 km || 
|-id=217 bgcolor=#fefefe
| 183217 ||  || — || October 2, 2002 || Socorro || LINEAR || — || align=right | 1.3 km || 
|-id=218 bgcolor=#fefefe
| 183218 ||  || — || October 2, 2002 || Socorro || LINEAR || V || align=right | 1.0 km || 
|-id=219 bgcolor=#E9E9E9
| 183219 ||  || — || October 2, 2002 || Socorro || LINEAR || — || align=right | 1.1 km || 
|-id=220 bgcolor=#FA8072
| 183220 ||  || — || October 2, 2002 || Socorro || LINEAR || — || align=right | 1.6 km || 
|-id=221 bgcolor=#E9E9E9
| 183221 ||  || — || October 2, 2002 || Socorro || LINEAR || — || align=right | 2.3 km || 
|-id=222 bgcolor=#fefefe
| 183222 ||  || — || October 2, 2002 || Socorro || LINEAR || — || align=right | 1.2 km || 
|-id=223 bgcolor=#fefefe
| 183223 ||  || — || October 2, 2002 || Socorro || LINEAR || FLO || align=right | 1.2 km || 
|-id=224 bgcolor=#fefefe
| 183224 ||  || — || October 2, 2002 || Socorro || LINEAR || V || align=right | 1.2 km || 
|-id=225 bgcolor=#fefefe
| 183225 ||  || — || October 2, 2002 || Socorro || LINEAR || — || align=right | 1.6 km || 
|-id=226 bgcolor=#fefefe
| 183226 ||  || — || October 2, 2002 || Socorro || LINEAR || NYS || align=right | 1.1 km || 
|-id=227 bgcolor=#fefefe
| 183227 ||  || — || October 2, 2002 || Socorro || LINEAR || — || align=right | 2.0 km || 
|-id=228 bgcolor=#fefefe
| 183228 ||  || — || October 2, 2002 || Socorro || LINEAR || — || align=right | 1.2 km || 
|-id=229 bgcolor=#fefefe
| 183229 ||  || — || October 1, 2002 || Anderson Mesa || LONEOS || — || align=right | 1.5 km || 
|-id=230 bgcolor=#FA8072
| 183230 ||  || — || October 4, 2002 || Socorro || LINEAR || — || align=right | 6.2 km || 
|-id=231 bgcolor=#d6d6d6
| 183231 ||  || — || October 2, 2002 || Campo Imperatore || CINEOS || — || align=right | 5.2 km || 
|-id=232 bgcolor=#E9E9E9
| 183232 ||  || — || October 3, 2002 || Palomar || NEAT || — || align=right | 4.2 km || 
|-id=233 bgcolor=#E9E9E9
| 183233 ||  || — || October 3, 2002 || Palomar || NEAT || — || align=right | 2.0 km || 
|-id=234 bgcolor=#fefefe
| 183234 ||  || — || October 3, 2002 || Palomar || NEAT || — || align=right | 1.5 km || 
|-id=235 bgcolor=#E9E9E9
| 183235 ||  || — || October 1, 2002 || Socorro || LINEAR || — || align=right | 2.3 km || 
|-id=236 bgcolor=#fefefe
| 183236 ||  || — || October 1, 2002 || Haleakala || NEAT || — || align=right | 1.1 km || 
|-id=237 bgcolor=#E9E9E9
| 183237 ||  || — || October 2, 2002 || Socorro || LINEAR || — || align=right | 1.2 km || 
|-id=238 bgcolor=#fefefe
| 183238 ||  || — || October 2, 2002 || Haleakala || NEAT || — || align=right | 1.2 km || 
|-id=239 bgcolor=#fefefe
| 183239 ||  || — || October 3, 2002 || Palomar || NEAT || — || align=right | 1.6 km || 
|-id=240 bgcolor=#E9E9E9
| 183240 ||  || — || October 3, 2002 || Palomar || NEAT || — || align=right | 2.8 km || 
|-id=241 bgcolor=#fefefe
| 183241 ||  || — || October 3, 2002 || Socorro || LINEAR || — || align=right | 1.2 km || 
|-id=242 bgcolor=#fefefe
| 183242 ||  || — || October 4, 2002 || Socorro || LINEAR || V || align=right | 1.1 km || 
|-id=243 bgcolor=#fefefe
| 183243 ||  || — || October 1, 2002 || Haleakala || NEAT || — || align=right | 1.5 km || 
|-id=244 bgcolor=#fefefe
| 183244 ||  || — || October 3, 2002 || Kitt Peak || Spacewatch || — || align=right | 1.1 km || 
|-id=245 bgcolor=#fefefe
| 183245 ||  || — || October 3, 2002 || Socorro || LINEAR || NYS || align=right | 1.1 km || 
|-id=246 bgcolor=#fefefe
| 183246 ||  || — || October 3, 2002 || Palomar || NEAT || V || align=right | 1.2 km || 
|-id=247 bgcolor=#fefefe
| 183247 ||  || — || October 4, 2002 || Palomar || NEAT || SVE || align=right | 2.7 km || 
|-id=248 bgcolor=#fefefe
| 183248 ||  || — || October 4, 2002 || Socorro || LINEAR || V || align=right data-sort-value="0.92" | 920 m || 
|-id=249 bgcolor=#fefefe
| 183249 ||  || — || October 4, 2002 || Socorro || LINEAR || — || align=right | 1.3 km || 
|-id=250 bgcolor=#fefefe
| 183250 ||  || — || October 4, 2002 || Socorro || LINEAR || V || align=right | 1.1 km || 
|-id=251 bgcolor=#fefefe
| 183251 ||  || — || October 4, 2002 || Palomar || NEAT || — || align=right | 1.6 km || 
|-id=252 bgcolor=#fefefe
| 183252 ||  || — || October 5, 2002 || Palomar || NEAT || — || align=right | 1.4 km || 
|-id=253 bgcolor=#E9E9E9
| 183253 ||  || — || October 5, 2002 || Palomar || NEAT || — || align=right | 1.7 km || 
|-id=254 bgcolor=#E9E9E9
| 183254 ||  || — || October 3, 2002 || Socorro || LINEAR || — || align=right | 1.3 km || 
|-id=255 bgcolor=#E9E9E9
| 183255 ||  || — || October 3, 2002 || Palomar || NEAT || — || align=right | 2.0 km || 
|-id=256 bgcolor=#fefefe
| 183256 ||  || — || October 4, 2002 || Socorro || LINEAR || V || align=right | 1.4 km || 
|-id=257 bgcolor=#fefefe
| 183257 ||  || — || October 4, 2002 || Socorro || LINEAR || CLA || align=right | 2.3 km || 
|-id=258 bgcolor=#E9E9E9
| 183258 ||  || — || October 3, 2002 || Socorro || LINEAR || — || align=right | 2.8 km || 
|-id=259 bgcolor=#fefefe
| 183259 ||  || — || October 4, 2002 || Socorro || LINEAR || — || align=right | 1.3 km || 
|-id=260 bgcolor=#E9E9E9
| 183260 ||  || — || October 4, 2002 || Socorro || LINEAR || MIT || align=right | 5.2 km || 
|-id=261 bgcolor=#E9E9E9
| 183261 ||  || — || October 4, 2002 || Socorro || LINEAR || — || align=right | 1.9 km || 
|-id=262 bgcolor=#fefefe
| 183262 ||  || — || October 6, 2002 || Haleakala || NEAT || — || align=right | 2.3 km || 
|-id=263 bgcolor=#fefefe
| 183263 ||  || — || October 4, 2002 || Socorro || LINEAR || — || align=right | 1.7 km || 
|-id=264 bgcolor=#fefefe
| 183264 ||  || — || October 5, 2002 || Campo Imperatore || CINEOS || — || align=right | 1.2 km || 
|-id=265 bgcolor=#fefefe
| 183265 ||  || — || October 7, 2002 || Anderson Mesa || LONEOS || — || align=right | 1.4 km || 
|-id=266 bgcolor=#fefefe
| 183266 ||  || — || October 8, 2002 || Anderson Mesa || LONEOS || — || align=right | 1.4 km || 
|-id=267 bgcolor=#fefefe
| 183267 ||  || — || October 8, 2002 || Anderson Mesa || LONEOS || — || align=right | 1.6 km || 
|-id=268 bgcolor=#fefefe
| 183268 ||  || — || October 8, 2002 || Anderson Mesa || LONEOS || — || align=right | 1.4 km || 
|-id=269 bgcolor=#fefefe
| 183269 ||  || — || October 7, 2002 || Socorro || LINEAR || MAS || align=right | 1.3 km || 
|-id=270 bgcolor=#fefefe
| 183270 ||  || — || October 7, 2002 || Socorro || LINEAR || NYS || align=right | 1.3 km || 
|-id=271 bgcolor=#fefefe
| 183271 ||  || — || October 7, 2002 || Palomar || NEAT || NYS || align=right | 1.1 km || 
|-id=272 bgcolor=#fefefe
| 183272 ||  || — || October 8, 2002 || Anderson Mesa || LONEOS || — || align=right | 1.5 km || 
|-id=273 bgcolor=#fefefe
| 183273 ||  || — || October 9, 2002 || Socorro || LINEAR || NYS || align=right | 1.3 km || 
|-id=274 bgcolor=#E9E9E9
| 183274 ||  || — || October 9, 2002 || Socorro || LINEAR || — || align=right | 1.9 km || 
|-id=275 bgcolor=#E9E9E9
| 183275 ||  || — || October 9, 2002 || Socorro || LINEAR || — || align=right | 1.1 km || 
|-id=276 bgcolor=#E9E9E9
| 183276 ||  || — || October 9, 2002 || Socorro || LINEAR || BAR || align=right | 2.2 km || 
|-id=277 bgcolor=#fefefe
| 183277 ||  || — || October 10, 2002 || Palomar || NEAT || — || align=right | 1.1 km || 
|-id=278 bgcolor=#E9E9E9
| 183278 ||  || — || October 9, 2002 || Socorro || LINEAR || — || align=right | 2.2 km || 
|-id=279 bgcolor=#fefefe
| 183279 ||  || — || October 9, 2002 || Socorro || LINEAR || V || align=right | 1.1 km || 
|-id=280 bgcolor=#E9E9E9
| 183280 ||  || — || October 9, 2002 || Socorro || LINEAR || — || align=right | 1.9 km || 
|-id=281 bgcolor=#fefefe
| 183281 ||  || — || October 10, 2002 || Socorro || LINEAR || V || align=right | 1.4 km || 
|-id=282 bgcolor=#fefefe
| 183282 ||  || — || October 10, 2002 || Socorro || LINEAR || — || align=right | 2.1 km || 
|-id=283 bgcolor=#fefefe
| 183283 ||  || — || October 10, 2002 || Socorro || LINEAR || FLO || align=right | 1.3 km || 
|-id=284 bgcolor=#fefefe
| 183284 ||  || — || October 10, 2002 || Socorro || LINEAR || — || align=right | 2.0 km || 
|-id=285 bgcolor=#E9E9E9
| 183285 ||  || — || October 12, 2002 || Socorro || LINEAR || WIT || align=right | 1.7 km || 
|-id=286 bgcolor=#fefefe
| 183286 ||  || — || October 4, 2002 || Apache Point || SDSS || — || align=right data-sort-value="0.93" | 930 m || 
|-id=287 bgcolor=#fefefe
| 183287 Deisenstein ||  ||  || October 5, 2002 || Apache Point || SDSS || NYS || align=right data-sort-value="0.86" | 860 m || 
|-id=288 bgcolor=#fefefe
| 183288 Eyer ||  ||  || October 5, 2002 || Apache Point || SDSS || — || align=right data-sort-value="0.90" | 900 m || 
|-id=289 bgcolor=#fefefe
| 183289 ||  || — || October 5, 2002 || Apache Point || SDSS || — || align=right | 1.3 km || 
|-id=290 bgcolor=#fefefe
| 183290 ||  || — || October 3, 2002 || Socorro || LINEAR || — || align=right | 1.0 km || 
|-id=291 bgcolor=#fefefe
| 183291 ||  || — || October 10, 2002 || Apache Point || SDSS || — || align=right | 1.4 km || 
|-id=292 bgcolor=#d6d6d6
| 183292 ||  || — || October 6, 2002 || Socorro || LINEAR || — || align=right | 4.6 km || 
|-id=293 bgcolor=#d6d6d6
| 183293 ||  || — || October 15, 2002 || Palomar || NEAT || — || align=right | 4.5 km || 
|-id=294 bgcolor=#d6d6d6
| 183294 Langbroek ||  ||  || October 9, 2002 || Palomar || NEAT || — || align=right | 5.8 km || 
|-id=295 bgcolor=#fefefe
| 183295 || 2002 UJ || — || October 19, 2002 || Palomar || NEAT || PHO || align=right | 2.2 km || 
|-id=296 bgcolor=#E9E9E9
| 183296 ||  || — || October 28, 2002 || Socorro || LINEAR || HNS || align=right | 1.9 km || 
|-id=297 bgcolor=#fefefe
| 183297 ||  || — || October 28, 2002 || Palomar || NEAT || — || align=right | 1.2 km || 
|-id=298 bgcolor=#E9E9E9
| 183298 ||  || — || October 29, 2002 || Palomar || NEAT || EUN || align=right | 2.0 km || 
|-id=299 bgcolor=#E9E9E9
| 183299 ||  || — || October 30, 2002 || Haleakala || NEAT || — || align=right | 1.5 km || 
|-id=300 bgcolor=#fefefe
| 183300 ||  || — || October 30, 2002 || Haleakala || NEAT || slow || align=right | 1.3 km || 
|}

183301–183400 

|-bgcolor=#E9E9E9
| 183301 ||  || — || October 28, 2002 || Haleakala || NEAT || — || align=right | 1.3 km || 
|-id=302 bgcolor=#fefefe
| 183302 ||  || — || October 30, 2002 || Palomar || NEAT || CIM || align=right | 3.4 km || 
|-id=303 bgcolor=#fefefe
| 183303 ||  || — || October 31, 2002 || Palomar || NEAT || V || align=right | 1.1 km || 
|-id=304 bgcolor=#fefefe
| 183304 ||  || — || October 31, 2002 || Palomar || NEAT || — || align=right | 1.4 km || 
|-id=305 bgcolor=#fefefe
| 183305 ||  || — || October 31, 2002 || Palomar || NEAT || — || align=right | 1.3 km || 
|-id=306 bgcolor=#E9E9E9
| 183306 ||  || — || October 31, 2002 || Socorro || LINEAR || — || align=right | 3.0 km || 
|-id=307 bgcolor=#fefefe
| 183307 ||  || — || October 29, 2002 || Apache Point || SDSS || — || align=right | 1.00 km || 
|-id=308 bgcolor=#d6d6d6
| 183308 ||  || — || October 25, 2002 || Palomar || NEAT || — || align=right | 5.0 km || 
|-id=309 bgcolor=#C2FFFF
| 183309 || 2002 VQ || — || November 2, 2002 || Wrightwood || J. W. Young || L5 || align=right | 9.9 km || 
|-id=310 bgcolor=#fefefe
| 183310 ||  || — || November 5, 2002 || La Palma || La Palma Obs. || NYS || align=right data-sort-value="0.81" | 810 m || 
|-id=311 bgcolor=#fefefe
| 183311 ||  || — || November 1, 2002 || Palomar || NEAT || — || align=right | 1.5 km || 
|-id=312 bgcolor=#E9E9E9
| 183312 ||  || — || November 1, 2002 || Palomar || NEAT || — || align=right | 1.2 km || 
|-id=313 bgcolor=#fefefe
| 183313 ||  || — || November 5, 2002 || Anderson Mesa || LONEOS || PHO || align=right | 2.1 km || 
|-id=314 bgcolor=#E9E9E9
| 183314 ||  || — || November 2, 2002 || Haleakala || NEAT || — || align=right | 1.4 km || 
|-id=315 bgcolor=#E9E9E9
| 183315 ||  || — || November 5, 2002 || Socorro || LINEAR || — || align=right | 2.2 km || 
|-id=316 bgcolor=#E9E9E9
| 183316 ||  || — || November 5, 2002 || Anderson Mesa || LONEOS || — || align=right | 1.7 km || 
|-id=317 bgcolor=#fefefe
| 183317 ||  || — || November 5, 2002 || Anderson Mesa || LONEOS || V || align=right | 1.2 km || 
|-id=318 bgcolor=#E9E9E9
| 183318 ||  || — || November 5, 2002 || Socorro || LINEAR || — || align=right | 2.1 km || 
|-id=319 bgcolor=#fefefe
| 183319 ||  || — || November 5, 2002 || Palomar || NEAT || V || align=right | 1.0 km || 
|-id=320 bgcolor=#E9E9E9
| 183320 ||  || — || November 5, 2002 || Palomar || NEAT || — || align=right | 1.5 km || 
|-id=321 bgcolor=#fefefe
| 183321 ||  || — || November 4, 2002 || Haleakala || NEAT || — || align=right | 1.5 km || 
|-id=322 bgcolor=#E9E9E9
| 183322 ||  || — || November 5, 2002 || Anderson Mesa || LONEOS || — || align=right | 2.1 km || 
|-id=323 bgcolor=#fefefe
| 183323 ||  || — || November 6, 2002 || Anderson Mesa || LONEOS || NYS || align=right | 1.0 km || 
|-id=324 bgcolor=#fefefe
| 183324 ||  || — || November 6, 2002 || Anderson Mesa || LONEOS || FLO || align=right | 2.1 km || 
|-id=325 bgcolor=#fefefe
| 183325 ||  || — || November 6, 2002 || Anderson Mesa || LONEOS || NYS || align=right data-sort-value="0.91" | 910 m || 
|-id=326 bgcolor=#fefefe
| 183326 ||  || — || November 6, 2002 || Anderson Mesa || LONEOS || V || align=right | 1.1 km || 
|-id=327 bgcolor=#fefefe
| 183327 ||  || — || November 6, 2002 || Anderson Mesa || LONEOS || — || align=right | 1.4 km || 
|-id=328 bgcolor=#fefefe
| 183328 ||  || — || November 6, 2002 || Socorro || LINEAR || NYS || align=right data-sort-value="0.96" | 960 m || 
|-id=329 bgcolor=#E9E9E9
| 183329 ||  || — || November 6, 2002 || Anderson Mesa || LONEOS || NEM || align=right | 3.5 km || 
|-id=330 bgcolor=#d6d6d6
| 183330 ||  || — || November 6, 2002 || Haleakala || NEAT || — || align=right | 4.2 km || 
|-id=331 bgcolor=#E9E9E9
| 183331 ||  || — || November 6, 2002 || Haleakala || NEAT || — || align=right | 1.7 km || 
|-id=332 bgcolor=#fefefe
| 183332 ||  || — || November 7, 2002 || Socorro || LINEAR || — || align=right | 1.4 km || 
|-id=333 bgcolor=#fefefe
| 183333 ||  || — || November 7, 2002 || Socorro || LINEAR || V || align=right data-sort-value="0.98" | 980 m || 
|-id=334 bgcolor=#E9E9E9
| 183334 ||  || — || November 7, 2002 || Socorro || LINEAR || — || align=right | 1.6 km || 
|-id=335 bgcolor=#fefefe
| 183335 ||  || — || November 7, 2002 || Socorro || LINEAR || V || align=right | 1.3 km || 
|-id=336 bgcolor=#E9E9E9
| 183336 ||  || — || November 7, 2002 || Socorro || LINEAR || — || align=right | 1.8 km || 
|-id=337 bgcolor=#E9E9E9
| 183337 ||  || — || November 7, 2002 || Socorro || LINEAR || — || align=right | 1.4 km || 
|-id=338 bgcolor=#E9E9E9
| 183338 ||  || — || November 7, 2002 || Socorro || LINEAR || — || align=right | 2.1 km || 
|-id=339 bgcolor=#d6d6d6
| 183339 ||  || — || November 8, 2002 || Socorro || LINEAR || — || align=right | 5.6 km || 
|-id=340 bgcolor=#E9E9E9
| 183340 ||  || — || November 8, 2002 || Socorro || LINEAR || — || align=right | 1.6 km || 
|-id=341 bgcolor=#E9E9E9
| 183341 ||  || — || November 11, 2002 || Palomar || NEAT || — || align=right | 2.0 km || 
|-id=342 bgcolor=#E9E9E9
| 183342 ||  || — || November 11, 2002 || Socorro || LINEAR || — || align=right | 1.3 km || 
|-id=343 bgcolor=#fefefe
| 183343 ||  || — || November 11, 2002 || Socorro || LINEAR || — || align=right | 1.2 km || 
|-id=344 bgcolor=#E9E9E9
| 183344 ||  || — || November 11, 2002 || Socorro || LINEAR || — || align=right | 1.2 km || 
|-id=345 bgcolor=#E9E9E9
| 183345 ||  || — || November 10, 2002 || Socorro || LINEAR || — || align=right | 1.6 km || 
|-id=346 bgcolor=#fefefe
| 183346 ||  || — || November 12, 2002 || Socorro || LINEAR || NYS || align=right data-sort-value="0.91" | 910 m || 
|-id=347 bgcolor=#fefefe
| 183347 ||  || — || November 12, 2002 || Socorro || LINEAR || — || align=right | 1.5 km || 
|-id=348 bgcolor=#E9E9E9
| 183348 ||  || — || November 12, 2002 || Socorro || LINEAR || — || align=right | 1.9 km || 
|-id=349 bgcolor=#E9E9E9
| 183349 ||  || — || November 12, 2002 || Socorro || LINEAR || — || align=right | 2.7 km || 
|-id=350 bgcolor=#fefefe
| 183350 ||  || — || November 12, 2002 || Palomar || NEAT || NYS || align=right | 1.2 km || 
|-id=351 bgcolor=#fefefe
| 183351 ||  || — || November 13, 2002 || Palomar || NEAT || — || align=right | 1.7 km || 
|-id=352 bgcolor=#E9E9E9
| 183352 ||  || — || November 13, 2002 || Palomar || NEAT || — || align=right | 1.4 km || 
|-id=353 bgcolor=#E9E9E9
| 183353 ||  || — || November 12, 2002 || Socorro || LINEAR || — || align=right | 2.3 km || 
|-id=354 bgcolor=#E9E9E9
| 183354 ||  || — || November 12, 2002 || Socorro || LINEAR || — || align=right | 3.5 km || 
|-id=355 bgcolor=#fefefe
| 183355 ||  || — || November 13, 2002 || Palomar || NEAT || — || align=right | 1.7 km || 
|-id=356 bgcolor=#fefefe
| 183356 ||  || — || November 6, 2002 || Kingsnake || J. V. McClusky || NYS || align=right | 1.0 km || 
|-id=357 bgcolor=#E9E9E9
| 183357 Rickshelton ||  ||  || November 9, 2002 || Kitt Peak || M. W. Buie || — || align=right | 1.2 km || 
|-id=358 bgcolor=#C2FFFF
| 183358 ||  || — || November 13, 2002 || Palomar || S. F. Hönig || L5 || align=right | 12 km || 
|-id=359 bgcolor=#E9E9E9
| 183359 ||  || — || November 6, 2002 || Socorro || LINEAR || RAF || align=right | 1.6 km || 
|-id=360 bgcolor=#d6d6d6
| 183360 ||  || — || November 13, 2002 || Palomar || NEAT || — || align=right | 3.1 km || 
|-id=361 bgcolor=#E9E9E9
| 183361 ||  || — || November 6, 2002 || Palomar || NEAT || JUN || align=right | 1.6 km || 
|-id=362 bgcolor=#E9E9E9
| 183362 ||  || — || November 28, 2002 || Anderson Mesa || LONEOS || — || align=right | 1.4 km || 
|-id=363 bgcolor=#fefefe
| 183363 ||  || — || November 28, 2002 || Anderson Mesa || LONEOS || CLA || align=right | 2.6 km || 
|-id=364 bgcolor=#d6d6d6
| 183364 ||  || — || November 28, 2002 || Haleakala || NEAT || — || align=right | 4.9 km || 
|-id=365 bgcolor=#fefefe
| 183365 ||  || — || November 24, 2002 || Palomar || S. F. Hönig || — || align=right | 1.5 km || 
|-id=366 bgcolor=#fefefe
| 183366 ||  || — || November 24, 2002 || Palomar || NEAT || V || align=right data-sort-value="0.83" | 830 m || 
|-id=367 bgcolor=#fefefe
| 183367 || 2002 XJ || — || December 1, 2002 || Socorro || LINEAR || MAS || align=right | 1.3 km || 
|-id=368 bgcolor=#E9E9E9
| 183368 ||  || — || December 2, 2002 || Socorro || LINEAR || JUN || align=right | 1.7 km || 
|-id=369 bgcolor=#E9E9E9
| 183369 ||  || — || December 3, 2002 || Palomar || NEAT || — || align=right | 2.6 km || 
|-id=370 bgcolor=#E9E9E9
| 183370 ||  || — || December 3, 2002 || Palomar || NEAT || HNS || align=right | 1.7 km || 
|-id=371 bgcolor=#E9E9E9
| 183371 ||  || — || December 2, 2002 || Socorro || LINEAR || — || align=right | 1.5 km || 
|-id=372 bgcolor=#E9E9E9
| 183372 ||  || — || December 2, 2002 || Socorro || LINEAR || — || align=right | 2.5 km || 
|-id=373 bgcolor=#E9E9E9
| 183373 ||  || — || December 3, 2002 || Palomar || NEAT || — || align=right | 1.8 km || 
|-id=374 bgcolor=#E9E9E9
| 183374 ||  || — || December 5, 2002 || Socorro || LINEAR || — || align=right | 1.6 km || 
|-id=375 bgcolor=#E9E9E9
| 183375 ||  || — || December 5, 2002 || Palomar || NEAT || — || align=right | 2.3 km || 
|-id=376 bgcolor=#E9E9E9
| 183376 ||  || — || December 6, 2002 || Socorro || LINEAR || — || align=right | 3.9 km || 
|-id=377 bgcolor=#E9E9E9
| 183377 ||  || — || December 6, 2002 || Socorro || LINEAR || — || align=right | 2.2 km || 
|-id=378 bgcolor=#E9E9E9
| 183378 ||  || — || December 7, 2002 || Socorro || LINEAR || JUN || align=right | 1.5 km || 
|-id=379 bgcolor=#fefefe
| 183379 ||  || — || December 7, 2002 || Emerald Lane || L. Ball || — || align=right | 1.2 km || 
|-id=380 bgcolor=#fefefe
| 183380 ||  || — || December 10, 2002 || Socorro || LINEAR || NYS || align=right | 1.2 km || 
|-id=381 bgcolor=#d6d6d6
| 183381 ||  || — || December 10, 2002 || Socorro || LINEAR || — || align=right | 7.0 km || 
|-id=382 bgcolor=#E9E9E9
| 183382 ||  || — || December 10, 2002 || Socorro || LINEAR || — || align=right | 1.4 km || 
|-id=383 bgcolor=#d6d6d6
| 183383 ||  || — || December 10, 2002 || Palomar || NEAT || — || align=right | 5.5 km || 
|-id=384 bgcolor=#E9E9E9
| 183384 ||  || — || December 10, 2002 || Palomar || NEAT || — || align=right | 2.3 km || 
|-id=385 bgcolor=#E9E9E9
| 183385 ||  || — || December 11, 2002 || Socorro || LINEAR || — || align=right | 1.8 km || 
|-id=386 bgcolor=#E9E9E9
| 183386 ||  || — || December 10, 2002 || Socorro || LINEAR || — || align=right | 5.2 km || 
|-id=387 bgcolor=#fefefe
| 183387 ||  || — || December 10, 2002 || Socorro || LINEAR || MAS || align=right | 1.3 km || 
|-id=388 bgcolor=#fefefe
| 183388 ||  || — || December 10, 2002 || Socorro || LINEAR || MAS || align=right | 1.2 km || 
|-id=389 bgcolor=#d6d6d6
| 183389 ||  || — || December 11, 2002 || Socorro || LINEAR || — || align=right | 4.1 km || 
|-id=390 bgcolor=#E9E9E9
| 183390 ||  || — || December 10, 2002 || Socorro || LINEAR || — || align=right | 1.9 km || 
|-id=391 bgcolor=#E9E9E9
| 183391 ||  || — || December 11, 2002 || Socorro || LINEAR || — || align=right | 1.7 km || 
|-id=392 bgcolor=#E9E9E9
| 183392 ||  || — || December 11, 2002 || Socorro || LINEAR || — || align=right | 2.5 km || 
|-id=393 bgcolor=#E9E9E9
| 183393 ||  || — || December 11, 2002 || Socorro || LINEAR || — || align=right | 1.9 km || 
|-id=394 bgcolor=#E9E9E9
| 183394 ||  || — || December 11, 2002 || Socorro || LINEAR || — || align=right | 2.5 km || 
|-id=395 bgcolor=#E9E9E9
| 183395 ||  || — || December 11, 2002 || Socorro || LINEAR || — || align=right | 1.8 km || 
|-id=396 bgcolor=#d6d6d6
| 183396 ||  || — || December 11, 2002 || Socorro || LINEAR || EOS || align=right | 5.0 km || 
|-id=397 bgcolor=#E9E9E9
| 183397 ||  || — || December 11, 2002 || Socorro || LINEAR || — || align=right | 1.6 km || 
|-id=398 bgcolor=#E9E9E9
| 183398 ||  || — || December 4, 2002 || Kitt Peak || M. W. Buie || — || align=right | 3.0 km || 
|-id=399 bgcolor=#fefefe
| 183399 ||  || — || December 6, 2002 || Kitt Peak || M. W. Buie || — || align=right | 1.6 km || 
|-id=400 bgcolor=#fefefe
| 183400 ||  || — || December 5, 2002 || Socorro || LINEAR || SUL || align=right | 3.6 km || 
|}

183401–183500 

|-bgcolor=#E9E9E9
| 183401 ||  || — || December 6, 2002 || Socorro || LINEAR || — || align=right | 2.5 km || 
|-id=402 bgcolor=#E9E9E9
| 183402 ||  || — || December 6, 2002 || Socorro || LINEAR || — || align=right | 2.0 km || 
|-id=403 bgcolor=#d6d6d6
| 183403 Gal ||  ||  || December 11, 2002 || Apache Point || SDSS || EOS || align=right | 3.0 km || 
|-id=404 bgcolor=#E9E9E9
| 183404 || 2002 YO || — || December 27, 2002 || Anderson Mesa || LONEOS || — || align=right | 2.5 km || 
|-id=405 bgcolor=#E9E9E9
| 183405 ||  || — || December 30, 2002 || Nogales || Tenagra II Obs. || AST || align=right | 3.0 km || 
|-id=406 bgcolor=#E9E9E9
| 183406 ||  || — || December 28, 2002 || Anderson Mesa || LONEOS || — || align=right | 3.4 km || 
|-id=407 bgcolor=#E9E9E9
| 183407 ||  || — || December 28, 2002 || Anderson Mesa || LONEOS || — || align=right | 2.8 km || 
|-id=408 bgcolor=#E9E9E9
| 183408 ||  || — || December 31, 2002 || Socorro || LINEAR || — || align=right | 2.1 km || 
|-id=409 bgcolor=#E9E9E9
| 183409 ||  || — || December 31, 2002 || Socorro || LINEAR || VIB || align=right | 3.1 km || 
|-id=410 bgcolor=#E9E9E9
| 183410 ||  || — || December 31, 2002 || Socorro || LINEAR || MIS || align=right | 3.5 km || 
|-id=411 bgcolor=#E9E9E9
| 183411 ||  || — || December 31, 2002 || Socorro || LINEAR || — || align=right | 1.2 km || 
|-id=412 bgcolor=#E9E9E9
| 183412 ||  || — || December 31, 2002 || Socorro || LINEAR || — || align=right | 2.4 km || 
|-id=413 bgcolor=#fefefe
| 183413 ||  || — || December 31, 2002 || Socorro || LINEAR || NYS || align=right | 1.5 km || 
|-id=414 bgcolor=#d6d6d6
| 183414 ||  || — || December 31, 2002 || Socorro || LINEAR || — || align=right | 4.2 km || 
|-id=415 bgcolor=#E9E9E9
| 183415 ||  || — || January 2, 2003 || Socorro || LINEAR || IAN || align=right | 1.4 km || 
|-id=416 bgcolor=#fefefe
| 183416 ||  || — || January 1, 2003 || Socorro || LINEAR || — || align=right | 1.4 km || 
|-id=417 bgcolor=#E9E9E9
| 183417 ||  || — || January 1, 2003 || Socorro || LINEAR || — || align=right | 3.1 km || 
|-id=418 bgcolor=#d6d6d6
| 183418 ||  || — || January 2, 2003 || Socorro || LINEAR || EOS || align=right | 2.9 km || 
|-id=419 bgcolor=#E9E9E9
| 183419 ||  || — || January 1, 2003 || Socorro || LINEAR || — || align=right | 1.8 km || 
|-id=420 bgcolor=#E9E9E9
| 183420 ||  || — || January 2, 2003 || Anderson Mesa || LONEOS || — || align=right | 4.2 km || 
|-id=421 bgcolor=#E9E9E9
| 183421 ||  || — || January 5, 2003 || Anderson Mesa || LONEOS || — || align=right | 3.3 km || 
|-id=422 bgcolor=#E9E9E9
| 183422 ||  || — || January 5, 2003 || Socorro || LINEAR || — || align=right | 2.2 km || 
|-id=423 bgcolor=#E9E9E9
| 183423 ||  || — || January 5, 2003 || Socorro || LINEAR || — || align=right | 1.7 km || 
|-id=424 bgcolor=#d6d6d6
| 183424 ||  || — || January 5, 2003 || Socorro || LINEAR || — || align=right | 3.6 km || 
|-id=425 bgcolor=#d6d6d6
| 183425 ||  || — || January 4, 2003 || Socorro || LINEAR || — || align=right | 4.8 km || 
|-id=426 bgcolor=#E9E9E9
| 183426 ||  || — || January 4, 2003 || Socorro || LINEAR || EUN || align=right | 2.0 km || 
|-id=427 bgcolor=#E9E9E9
| 183427 ||  || — || January 4, 2003 || Socorro || LINEAR || — || align=right | 2.6 km || 
|-id=428 bgcolor=#d6d6d6
| 183428 ||  || — || January 4, 2003 || Socorro || LINEAR || ALA || align=right | 7.5 km || 
|-id=429 bgcolor=#E9E9E9
| 183429 ||  || — || January 7, 2003 || Socorro || LINEAR || — || align=right | 2.8 km || 
|-id=430 bgcolor=#E9E9E9
| 183430 ||  || — || January 5, 2003 || Socorro || LINEAR || — || align=right | 2.6 km || 
|-id=431 bgcolor=#E9E9E9
| 183431 ||  || — || January 5, 2003 || Socorro || LINEAR || INO || align=right | 1.9 km || 
|-id=432 bgcolor=#E9E9E9
| 183432 ||  || — || January 7, 2003 || Socorro || LINEAR || — || align=right | 3.2 km || 
|-id=433 bgcolor=#fefefe
| 183433 ||  || — || January 8, 2003 || Socorro || LINEAR || NYS || align=right | 3.3 km || 
|-id=434 bgcolor=#E9E9E9
| 183434 ||  || — || January 8, 2003 || Socorro || LINEAR || — || align=right | 2.0 km || 
|-id=435 bgcolor=#E9E9E9
| 183435 ||  || — || January 7, 2003 || Socorro || LINEAR || — || align=right | 4.3 km || 
|-id=436 bgcolor=#E9E9E9
| 183436 ||  || — || January 7, 2003 || Socorro || LINEAR || — || align=right | 2.2 km || 
|-id=437 bgcolor=#E9E9E9
| 183437 ||  || — || January 7, 2003 || Socorro || LINEAR || — || align=right | 5.3 km || 
|-id=438 bgcolor=#E9E9E9
| 183438 ||  || — || January 8, 2003 || Socorro || LINEAR || — || align=right | 2.1 km || 
|-id=439 bgcolor=#E9E9E9
| 183439 ||  || — || January 10, 2003 || Socorro || LINEAR || — || align=right | 2.0 km || 
|-id=440 bgcolor=#E9E9E9
| 183440 ||  || — || January 8, 2003 || Bergisch Gladbach || W. Bickel || — || align=right | 3.4 km || 
|-id=441 bgcolor=#E9E9E9
| 183441 ||  || — || January 11, 2003 || Goodricke-Pigott || R. A. Tucker || — || align=right | 3.3 km || 
|-id=442 bgcolor=#d6d6d6
| 183442 ||  || — || January 5, 2003 || Socorro || LINEAR || — || align=right | 4.8 km || 
|-id=443 bgcolor=#E9E9E9
| 183443 ||  || — || January 7, 2003 || Socorro || LINEAR || — || align=right | 2.7 km || 
|-id=444 bgcolor=#E9E9E9
| 183444 ||  || — || January 10, 2003 || Socorro || LINEAR || GEF || align=right | 2.0 km || 
|-id=445 bgcolor=#E9E9E9
| 183445 ||  || — || January 24, 2003 || La Silla || A. Boattini, H. Scholl || — || align=right | 3.2 km || 
|-id=446 bgcolor=#fefefe
| 183446 ||  || — || January 26, 2003 || Kitt Peak || Spacewatch || — || align=right | 1.0 km || 
|-id=447 bgcolor=#E9E9E9
| 183447 ||  || — || January 26, 2003 || Anderson Mesa || LONEOS || — || align=right | 1.7 km || 
|-id=448 bgcolor=#E9E9E9
| 183448 ||  || — || January 26, 2003 || Anderson Mesa || LONEOS || — || align=right | 3.7 km || 
|-id=449 bgcolor=#E9E9E9
| 183449 ||  || — || January 26, 2003 || Haleakala || NEAT || — || align=right | 3.1 km || 
|-id=450 bgcolor=#E9E9E9
| 183450 ||  || — || January 27, 2003 || Socorro || LINEAR || HNS || align=right | 2.1 km || 
|-id=451 bgcolor=#E9E9E9
| 183451 ||  || — || January 26, 2003 || Palomar || NEAT || EUN || align=right | 1.9 km || 
|-id=452 bgcolor=#E9E9E9
| 183452 ||  || — || January 27, 2003 || Anderson Mesa || LONEOS || ADE || align=right | 3.4 km || 
|-id=453 bgcolor=#E9E9E9
| 183453 ||  || — || January 25, 2003 || Palomar || NEAT || — || align=right | 2.4 km || 
|-id=454 bgcolor=#E9E9E9
| 183454 ||  || — || January 25, 2003 || Palomar || NEAT || — || align=right | 2.2 km || 
|-id=455 bgcolor=#E9E9E9
| 183455 ||  || — || January 27, 2003 || Socorro || LINEAR || — || align=right | 3.5 km || 
|-id=456 bgcolor=#E9E9E9
| 183456 ||  || — || January 25, 2003 || Palomar || NEAT || — || align=right | 3.3 km || 
|-id=457 bgcolor=#E9E9E9
| 183457 ||  || — || January 27, 2003 || Socorro || LINEAR || — || align=right | 2.9 km || 
|-id=458 bgcolor=#E9E9E9
| 183458 ||  || — || January 29, 2003 || Palomar || NEAT || — || align=right | 3.4 km || 
|-id=459 bgcolor=#E9E9E9
| 183459 ||  || — || January 29, 2003 || Socorro || LINEAR || — || align=right | 2.2 km || 
|-id=460 bgcolor=#E9E9E9
| 183460 ||  || — || January 27, 2003 || Anderson Mesa || LONEOS || INOslow || align=right | 2.1 km || 
|-id=461 bgcolor=#E9E9E9
| 183461 ||  || — || January 27, 2003 || Palomar || NEAT || — || align=right | 2.3 km || 
|-id=462 bgcolor=#E9E9E9
| 183462 ||  || — || January 28, 2003 || Haleakala || NEAT || — || align=right | 3.0 km || 
|-id=463 bgcolor=#E9E9E9
| 183463 ||  || — || January 27, 2003 || Haleakala || NEAT || — || align=right | 2.1 km || 
|-id=464 bgcolor=#E9E9E9
| 183464 ||  || — || January 27, 2003 || Palomar || NEAT || — || align=right | 1.8 km || 
|-id=465 bgcolor=#E9E9E9
| 183465 ||  || — || January 28, 2003 || Palomar || NEAT || MAR || align=right | 2.1 km || 
|-id=466 bgcolor=#E9E9E9
| 183466 ||  || — || January 29, 2003 || Palomar || NEAT || — || align=right | 5.2 km || 
|-id=467 bgcolor=#E9E9E9
| 183467 ||  || — || January 29, 2003 || Palomar || NEAT || — || align=right | 2.9 km || 
|-id=468 bgcolor=#E9E9E9
| 183468 ||  || — || January 29, 2003 || Palomar || NEAT || ADE || align=right | 4.3 km || 
|-id=469 bgcolor=#E9E9E9
| 183469 ||  || — || January 31, 2003 || Socorro || LINEAR || — || align=right | 3.1 km || 
|-id=470 bgcolor=#E9E9E9
| 183470 ||  || — || January 31, 2003 || Socorro || LINEAR || — || align=right | 3.2 km || 
|-id=471 bgcolor=#E9E9E9
| 183471 ||  || — || January 25, 2003 || Anderson Mesa || LONEOS || MAR || align=right | 1.6 km || 
|-id=472 bgcolor=#E9E9E9
| 183472 ||  || — || January 27, 2003 || Socorro || LINEAR || — || align=right | 1.9 km || 
|-id=473 bgcolor=#E9E9E9
| 183473 ||  || — || January 27, 2003 || Socorro || LINEAR || NEM || align=right | 3.2 km || 
|-id=474 bgcolor=#E9E9E9
| 183474 ||  || — || February 1, 2003 || Socorro || LINEAR || — || align=right | 4.0 km || 
|-id=475 bgcolor=#d6d6d6
| 183475 ||  || — || February 1, 2003 || Socorro || LINEAR || — || align=right | 4.1 km || 
|-id=476 bgcolor=#E9E9E9
| 183476 ||  || — || February 4, 2003 || Anderson Mesa || LONEOS || — || align=right | 4.8 km || 
|-id=477 bgcolor=#E9E9E9
| 183477 ||  || — || February 8, 2003 || Socorro || LINEAR || — || align=right | 3.3 km || 
|-id=478 bgcolor=#E9E9E9
| 183478 ||  || — || February 7, 2003 || Palomar || NEAT || — || align=right | 3.9 km || 
|-id=479 bgcolor=#E9E9E9
| 183479 ||  || — || February 19, 2003 || Palomar || NEAT || — || align=right | 2.3 km || 
|-id=480 bgcolor=#d6d6d6
| 183480 ||  || — || February 19, 2003 || Palomar || NEAT || 628 || align=right | 2.4 km || 
|-id=481 bgcolor=#E9E9E9
| 183481 ||  || — || February 19, 2003 || Palomar || NEAT || — || align=right | 3.6 km || 
|-id=482 bgcolor=#d6d6d6
| 183482 ||  || — || February 25, 2003 || Campo Imperatore || CINEOS || KAR || align=right | 1.4 km || 
|-id=483 bgcolor=#E9E9E9
| 183483 ||  || — || February 26, 2003 || Campo Imperatore || CINEOS || — || align=right | 3.1 km || 
|-id=484 bgcolor=#E9E9E9
| 183484 ||  || — || February 25, 2003 || Campo Imperatore || CINEOS || HNA || align=right | 3.9 km || 
|-id=485 bgcolor=#d6d6d6
| 183485 ||  || — || February 21, 2003 || Palomar || NEAT || — || align=right | 5.4 km || 
|-id=486 bgcolor=#d6d6d6
| 183486 ||  || — || February 28, 2003 || Socorro || LINEAR || — || align=right | 4.8 km || 
|-id=487 bgcolor=#E9E9E9
| 183487 ||  || — || March 6, 2003 || Palomar || NEAT || — || align=right | 3.2 km || 
|-id=488 bgcolor=#d6d6d6
| 183488 ||  || — || March 6, 2003 || Anderson Mesa || LONEOS || LAU || align=right | 1.6 km || 
|-id=489 bgcolor=#E9E9E9
| 183489 ||  || — || March 6, 2003 || Anderson Mesa || LONEOS || — || align=right | 3.7 km || 
|-id=490 bgcolor=#E9E9E9
| 183490 ||  || — || March 6, 2003 || Anderson Mesa || LONEOS || — || align=right | 3.7 km || 
|-id=491 bgcolor=#d6d6d6
| 183491 ||  || — || March 6, 2003 || Socorro || LINEAR || HYG || align=right | 3.9 km || 
|-id=492 bgcolor=#d6d6d6
| 183492 ||  || — || March 6, 2003 || Anderson Mesa || LONEOS || TRP || align=right | 4.8 km || 
|-id=493 bgcolor=#d6d6d6
| 183493 ||  || — || March 6, 2003 || Socorro || LINEAR || — || align=right | 3.6 km || 
|-id=494 bgcolor=#d6d6d6
| 183494 ||  || — || March 7, 2003 || Socorro || LINEAR || — || align=right | 4.5 km || 
|-id=495 bgcolor=#E9E9E9
| 183495 ||  || — || March 8, 2003 || Anderson Mesa || LONEOS || — || align=right | 4.7 km || 
|-id=496 bgcolor=#E9E9E9
| 183496 ||  || — || March 8, 2003 || Anderson Mesa || LONEOS || — || align=right | 4.3 km || 
|-id=497 bgcolor=#d6d6d6
| 183497 ||  || — || March 7, 2003 || Anderson Mesa || LONEOS || — || align=right | 3.5 km || 
|-id=498 bgcolor=#d6d6d6
| 183498 ||  || — || March 9, 2003 || Socorro || LINEAR || — || align=right | 4.5 km || 
|-id=499 bgcolor=#E9E9E9
| 183499 ||  || — || March 6, 2003 || Socorro || LINEAR || NEM || align=right | 3.6 km || 
|-id=500 bgcolor=#d6d6d6
| 183500 ||  || — || March 24, 2003 || Haleakala || NEAT || EUP || align=right | 5.8 km || 
|}

183501–183600 

|-bgcolor=#E9E9E9
| 183501 ||  || — || March 25, 2003 || Wrightwood || J. W. Young || — || align=right | 2.4 km || 
|-id=502 bgcolor=#fefefe
| 183502 ||  || — || March 30, 2003 || Socorro || LINEAR || H || align=right data-sort-value="0.89" | 890 m || 
|-id=503 bgcolor=#d6d6d6
| 183503 ||  || — || March 22, 2003 || Kvistaberg || UDAS || EOS || align=right | 2.9 km || 
|-id=504 bgcolor=#d6d6d6
| 183504 ||  || — || March 23, 2003 || Kitt Peak || Spacewatch || — || align=right | 4.7 km || 
|-id=505 bgcolor=#d6d6d6
| 183505 ||  || — || March 24, 2003 || Kitt Peak || Spacewatch || THM || align=right | 2.6 km || 
|-id=506 bgcolor=#d6d6d6
| 183506 ||  || — || March 23, 2003 || Kitt Peak || Spacewatch || EOS || align=right | 3.7 km || 
|-id=507 bgcolor=#d6d6d6
| 183507 ||  || — || March 23, 2003 || Kitt Peak || Spacewatch || — || align=right | 3.4 km || 
|-id=508 bgcolor=#E9E9E9
| 183508 ||  || — || March 23, 2003 || Kitt Peak || Spacewatch || — || align=right | 3.1 km || 
|-id=509 bgcolor=#E9E9E9
| 183509 ||  || — || March 25, 2003 || Palomar || NEAT || — || align=right | 3.3 km || 
|-id=510 bgcolor=#d6d6d6
| 183510 ||  || — || March 25, 2003 || Palomar || NEAT || — || align=right | 3.3 km || 
|-id=511 bgcolor=#fefefe
| 183511 ||  || — || March 24, 2003 || Kitt Peak || Spacewatch || H || align=right | 1.1 km || 
|-id=512 bgcolor=#E9E9E9
| 183512 ||  || — || March 25, 2003 || Palomar || NEAT || — || align=right | 2.4 km || 
|-id=513 bgcolor=#d6d6d6
| 183513 ||  || — || March 25, 2003 || Palomar || NEAT || — || align=right | 6.2 km || 
|-id=514 bgcolor=#d6d6d6
| 183514 ||  || — || March 26, 2003 || Kitt Peak || Spacewatch || THB || align=right | 5.9 km || 
|-id=515 bgcolor=#E9E9E9
| 183515 ||  || — || March 26, 2003 || Palomar || NEAT || WIT || align=right | 1.9 km || 
|-id=516 bgcolor=#d6d6d6
| 183516 ||  || — || March 27, 2003 || Kitt Peak || Spacewatch || — || align=right | 3.7 km || 
|-id=517 bgcolor=#E9E9E9
| 183517 ||  || — || March 27, 2003 || Socorro || LINEAR || — || align=right | 4.5 km || 
|-id=518 bgcolor=#d6d6d6
| 183518 ||  || — || March 27, 2003 || Socorro || LINEAR || — || align=right | 4.6 km || 
|-id=519 bgcolor=#d6d6d6
| 183519 ||  || — || March 28, 2003 || Kitt Peak || Spacewatch || — || align=right | 3.9 km || 
|-id=520 bgcolor=#d6d6d6
| 183520 ||  || — || March 29, 2003 || Anderson Mesa || LONEOS || — || align=right | 4.8 km || 
|-id=521 bgcolor=#d6d6d6
| 183521 ||  || — || March 29, 2003 || Anderson Mesa || LONEOS || — || align=right | 4.6 km || 
|-id=522 bgcolor=#d6d6d6
| 183522 ||  || — || March 29, 2003 || Anderson Mesa || LONEOS || — || align=right | 4.6 km || 
|-id=523 bgcolor=#d6d6d6
| 183523 ||  || — || March 29, 2003 || Anderson Mesa || LONEOS || EOS || align=right | 3.8 km || 
|-id=524 bgcolor=#E9E9E9
| 183524 ||  || — || March 31, 2003 || Socorro || LINEAR || — || align=right | 4.0 km || 
|-id=525 bgcolor=#d6d6d6
| 183525 ||  || — || March 30, 2003 || Kitt Peak || Spacewatch || 7:4 || align=right | 8.0 km || 
|-id=526 bgcolor=#d6d6d6
| 183526 ||  || — || March 31, 2003 || Anderson Mesa || LONEOS || — || align=right | 7.1 km || 
|-id=527 bgcolor=#d6d6d6
| 183527 ||  || — || March 26, 2003 || Anderson Mesa || LONEOS || FIR || align=right | 5.3 km || 
|-id=528 bgcolor=#E9E9E9
| 183528 ||  || — || March 31, 2003 || Kitt Peak || Spacewatch || — || align=right | 3.1 km || 
|-id=529 bgcolor=#d6d6d6
| 183529 ||  || — || March 31, 2003 || Catalina || CSS || MEL || align=right | 6.1 km || 
|-id=530 bgcolor=#d6d6d6
| 183530 ||  || — || March 29, 2003 || Anderson Mesa || LONEOS || EOS || align=right | 2.8 km || 
|-id=531 bgcolor=#d6d6d6
| 183531 ||  || — || March 27, 2003 || Kitt Peak || Spacewatch || — || align=right | 3.8 km || 
|-id=532 bgcolor=#E9E9E9
| 183532 ||  || — || April 6, 2003 || Anderson Mesa || LONEOS || GEF || align=right | 2.5 km || 
|-id=533 bgcolor=#d6d6d6
| 183533 ||  || — || April 6, 2003 || Haleakala || NEAT || Tj (2.94) || align=right | 6.2 km || 
|-id=534 bgcolor=#d6d6d6
| 183534 ||  || — || April 7, 2003 || Kitt Peak || Spacewatch || EOS || align=right | 4.9 km || 
|-id=535 bgcolor=#d6d6d6
| 183535 ||  || — || April 8, 2003 || Palomar || NEAT || EOS || align=right | 3.7 km || 
|-id=536 bgcolor=#d6d6d6
| 183536 ||  || — || April 4, 2003 || Kitt Peak || Spacewatch || — || align=right | 4.3 km || 
|-id=537 bgcolor=#d6d6d6
| 183537 ||  || — || April 4, 2003 || Kitt Peak || Spacewatch || — || align=right | 4.5 km || 
|-id=538 bgcolor=#d6d6d6
| 183538 ||  || — || April 4, 2003 || Anderson Mesa || LONEOS || — || align=right | 5.0 km || 
|-id=539 bgcolor=#fefefe
| 183539 ||  || — || April 27, 2003 || Socorro || LINEAR || H || align=right | 1.1 km || 
|-id=540 bgcolor=#d6d6d6
| 183540 ||  || — || April 24, 2003 || Anderson Mesa || LONEOS || EOS || align=right | 3.3 km || 
|-id=541 bgcolor=#d6d6d6
| 183541 ||  || — || April 26, 2003 || Kitt Peak || Spacewatch || — || align=right | 4.2 km || 
|-id=542 bgcolor=#E9E9E9
| 183542 ||  || — || April 27, 2003 || Kitt Peak || Spacewatch || GEF || align=right | 1.6 km || 
|-id=543 bgcolor=#d6d6d6
| 183543 ||  || — || April 25, 2003 || Kitt Peak || Spacewatch || KOR || align=right | 1.7 km || 
|-id=544 bgcolor=#d6d6d6
| 183544 ||  || — || April 26, 2003 || Kitt Peak || Spacewatch || EOS || align=right | 3.3 km || 
|-id=545 bgcolor=#fefefe
| 183545 ||  || — || April 26, 2003 || Haleakala || NEAT || FLO || align=right | 2.7 km || 
|-id=546 bgcolor=#d6d6d6
| 183546 ||  || — || April 29, 2003 || Socorro || LINEAR || — || align=right | 4.8 km || 
|-id=547 bgcolor=#d6d6d6
| 183547 ||  || — || April 29, 2003 || Anderson Mesa || LONEOS || — || align=right | 3.6 km || 
|-id=548 bgcolor=#FFC2E0
| 183548 ||  || — || April 29, 2003 || Kitt Peak || Spacewatch || AMO +1km || align=right | 1.0 km || 
|-id=549 bgcolor=#d6d6d6
| 183549 ||  || — || April 29, 2003 || Socorro || LINEAR || — || align=right | 4.6 km || 
|-id=550 bgcolor=#d6d6d6
| 183550 ||  || — || April 24, 2003 || Kitt Peak || Spacewatch || — || align=right | 3.9 km || 
|-id=551 bgcolor=#d6d6d6
| 183551 ||  || — || May 3, 2003 || Kitt Peak || Spacewatch || — || align=right | 4.7 km || 
|-id=552 bgcolor=#d6d6d6
| 183552 ||  || — || May 1, 2003 || Kitt Peak || Spacewatch || — || align=right | 3.8 km || 
|-id=553 bgcolor=#d6d6d6
| 183553 ||  || — || May 2, 2003 || Kitt Peak || Spacewatch || CHA || align=right | 3.0 km || 
|-id=554 bgcolor=#d6d6d6
| 183554 ||  || — || May 5, 2003 || Kitt Peak || Spacewatch || — || align=right | 5.8 km || 
|-id=555 bgcolor=#d6d6d6
| 183555 ||  || — || May 6, 2003 || Nogales || Tenagra II Obs. || — || align=right | 6.6 km || 
|-id=556 bgcolor=#d6d6d6
| 183556 ||  || — || May 5, 2003 || Anderson Mesa || LONEOS || — || align=right | 3.3 km || 
|-id=557 bgcolor=#d6d6d6
| 183557 ||  || — || May 22, 2003 || Kitt Peak || Spacewatch || HYG || align=right | 3.9 km || 
|-id=558 bgcolor=#d6d6d6
| 183558 ||  || — || May 25, 2003 || Anderson Mesa || LONEOS || EUP || align=right | 6.2 km || 
|-id=559 bgcolor=#d6d6d6
| 183559 ||  || — || May 26, 2003 || Kitt Peak || Spacewatch || VER || align=right | 4.1 km || 
|-id=560 bgcolor=#d6d6d6
| 183560 Křišťan ||  ||  || May 24, 2003 || Kleť || KLENOT || THB || align=right | 5.6 km || 
|-id=561 bgcolor=#d6d6d6
| 183561 ||  || — || May 27, 2003 || Kitt Peak || Spacewatch || — || align=right | 5.2 km || 
|-id=562 bgcolor=#d6d6d6
| 183562 ||  || — || June 5, 2003 || Kitt Peak || Spacewatch || HYG || align=right | 3.6 km || 
|-id=563 bgcolor=#d6d6d6
| 183563 ||  || — || June 22, 2003 || Nogales || M. Schwartz, P. R. Holvorcem || — || align=right | 3.6 km || 
|-id=564 bgcolor=#d6d6d6
| 183564 ||  || — || June 29, 2003 || Socorro || LINEAR || — || align=right | 7.1 km || 
|-id=565 bgcolor=#fefefe
| 183565 ||  || — || July 3, 2003 || Reedy Creek || J. Broughton || — || align=right | 1.3 km || 
|-id=566 bgcolor=#d6d6d6
| 183566 ||  || — || July 4, 2003 || Haleakala || NEAT || — || align=right | 6.7 km || 
|-id=567 bgcolor=#fefefe
| 183567 ||  || — || July 27, 2003 || Reedy Creek || J. Broughton || — || align=right | 1.3 km || 
|-id=568 bgcolor=#fefefe
| 183568 ||  || — || July 20, 2003 || Palomar || NEAT || H || align=right data-sort-value="0.87" | 870 m || 
|-id=569 bgcolor=#d6d6d6
| 183569 ||  || — || August 2, 2003 || Haleakala || NEAT || — || align=right | 5.3 km || 
|-id=570 bgcolor=#fefefe
| 183570 ||  || — || August 19, 2003 || Campo Imperatore || CINEOS || NYS || align=right data-sort-value="0.86" | 860 m || 
|-id=571 bgcolor=#fefefe
| 183571 ||  || — || August 20, 2003 || Palomar || NEAT || — || align=right | 1.6 km || 
|-id=572 bgcolor=#fefefe
| 183572 ||  || — || August 21, 2003 || Palomar || NEAT || — || align=right | 1.00 km || 
|-id=573 bgcolor=#fefefe
| 183573 ||  || — || August 23, 2003 || Palomar || NEAT || MAS || align=right | 1.1 km || 
|-id=574 bgcolor=#fefefe
| 183574 ||  || — || August 23, 2003 || Socorro || LINEAR || — || align=right | 1.2 km || 
|-id=575 bgcolor=#d6d6d6
| 183575 ||  || — || August 23, 2003 || Socorro || LINEAR || 7:4 || align=right | 6.0 km || 
|-id=576 bgcolor=#fefefe
| 183576 ||  || — || September 3, 2003 || Haleakala || NEAT || — || align=right | 2.3 km || 
|-id=577 bgcolor=#fefefe
| 183577 ||  || — || September 16, 2003 || Kitt Peak || Spacewatch || — || align=right | 1.1 km || 
|-id=578 bgcolor=#fefefe
| 183578 ||  || — || September 16, 2003 || Kitt Peak || Spacewatch || NYS || align=right data-sort-value="0.68" | 680 m || 
|-id=579 bgcolor=#d6d6d6
| 183579 ||  || — || September 17, 2003 || Haleakala || NEAT || HIL3:2 || align=right | 9.8 km || 
|-id=580 bgcolor=#fefefe
| 183580 ||  || — || September 16, 2003 || Anderson Mesa || LONEOS || MAS || align=right | 1.3 km || 
|-id=581 bgcolor=#FA8072
| 183581 ||  || — || September 20, 2003 || Haleakala || NEAT || slow || align=right | 2.3 km || 
|-id=582 bgcolor=#fefefe
| 183582 ||  || — || September 19, 2003 || Ondřejov || P. Kušnirák || — || align=right | 1.2 km || 
|-id=583 bgcolor=#fefefe
| 183583 ||  || — || September 19, 2003 || Kitt Peak || Spacewatch || — || align=right | 1.3 km || 
|-id=584 bgcolor=#fefefe
| 183584 ||  || — || September 20, 2003 || Socorro || LINEAR || — || align=right | 1.5 km || 
|-id=585 bgcolor=#fefefe
| 183585 ||  || — || September 18, 2003 || Goodricke-Pigott || R. A. Tucker || — || align=right | 2.5 km || 
|-id=586 bgcolor=#fefefe
| 183586 ||  || — || September 22, 2003 || Kitt Peak || Spacewatch || NYS || align=right | 1.0 km || 
|-id=587 bgcolor=#fefefe
| 183587 ||  || — || September 26, 2003 || Socorro || LINEAR || — || align=right data-sort-value="0.99" | 990 m || 
|-id=588 bgcolor=#fefefe
| 183588 ||  || — || September 28, 2003 || Socorro || LINEAR || NYS || align=right data-sort-value="0.93" | 930 m || 
|-id=589 bgcolor=#fefefe
| 183589 ||  || — || September 20, 2003 || Socorro || LINEAR || V || align=right | 1.1 km || 
|-id=590 bgcolor=#fefefe
| 183590 ||  || — || September 28, 2003 || Socorro || LINEAR || — || align=right | 1.5 km || 
|-id=591 bgcolor=#fefefe
| 183591 ||  || — || September 17, 2003 || Palomar || NEAT || — || align=right | 1.1 km || 
|-id=592 bgcolor=#FA8072
| 183592 ||  || — || September 18, 2003 || Haleakala || NEAT || — || align=right data-sort-value="0.91" | 910 m || 
|-id=593 bgcolor=#fefefe
| 183593 ||  || — || October 15, 2003 || Anderson Mesa || LONEOS || — || align=right | 1.0 km || 
|-id=594 bgcolor=#fefefe
| 183594 ||  || — || October 5, 2003 || Kitt Peak || Spacewatch || — || align=right data-sort-value="0.94" | 940 m || 
|-id=595 bgcolor=#C2E0FF
| 183595 ||  || — || October 3, 2003 || Mauna Kea || Mauna Kea Obs. || cubewano (cold)critical || align=right | 214 km || 
|-id=596 bgcolor=#fefefe
| 183596 || 2003 UV || — || October 16, 2003 || Kitt Peak || Spacewatch || — || align=right | 1.0 km || 
|-id=597 bgcolor=#E9E9E9
| 183597 ||  || — || October 16, 2003 || Kitt Peak || Spacewatch || HOF || align=right | 4.7 km || 
|-id=598 bgcolor=#fefefe
| 183598 ||  || — || October 16, 2003 || Anderson Mesa || LONEOS || FLO || align=right data-sort-value="0.90" | 900 m || 
|-id=599 bgcolor=#E9E9E9
| 183599 ||  || — || October 16, 2003 || Kitt Peak || Spacewatch || — || align=right | 1.7 km || 
|-id=600 bgcolor=#fefefe
| 183600 ||  || — || October 18, 2003 || Kitt Peak || Spacewatch || MAS || align=right | 1.3 km || 
|}

183601–183700 

|-bgcolor=#fefefe
| 183601 ||  || — || October 16, 2003 || Kitt Peak || Spacewatch || V || align=right data-sort-value="0.87" | 870 m || 
|-id=602 bgcolor=#fefefe
| 183602 ||  || — || October 16, 2003 || Anderson Mesa || LONEOS || V || align=right | 1.0 km || 
|-id=603 bgcolor=#fefefe
| 183603 ||  || — || October 19, 2003 || Kitt Peak || Spacewatch || — || align=right | 1.2 km || 
|-id=604 bgcolor=#fefefe
| 183604 ||  || — || October 17, 2003 || Kitt Peak || Spacewatch || V || align=right | 1.2 km || 
|-id=605 bgcolor=#fefefe
| 183605 ||  || — || October 18, 2003 || Kitt Peak || Spacewatch || — || align=right | 1.1 km || 
|-id=606 bgcolor=#fefefe
| 183606 ||  || — || October 20, 2003 || Palomar || NEAT || — || align=right data-sort-value="0.82" | 820 m || 
|-id=607 bgcolor=#fefefe
| 183607 ||  || — || October 20, 2003 || Palomar || NEAT || — || align=right | 1.4 km || 
|-id=608 bgcolor=#fefefe
| 183608 ||  || — || October 21, 2003 || Palomar || NEAT || FLO || align=right data-sort-value="0.87" | 870 m || 
|-id=609 bgcolor=#fefefe
| 183609 ||  || — || October 21, 2003 || Kitt Peak || Spacewatch || — || align=right data-sort-value="0.89" | 890 m || 
|-id=610 bgcolor=#fefefe
| 183610 ||  || — || October 21, 2003 || Anderson Mesa || LONEOS || NYS || align=right data-sort-value="0.88" | 880 m || 
|-id=611 bgcolor=#fefefe
| 183611 ||  || — || October 21, 2003 || Anderson Mesa || LONEOS || — || align=right data-sort-value="0.89" | 890 m || 
|-id=612 bgcolor=#fefefe
| 183612 ||  || — || October 21, 2003 || Socorro || LINEAR || — || align=right | 1.3 km || 
|-id=613 bgcolor=#fefefe
| 183613 ||  || — || October 21, 2003 || Socorro || LINEAR || — || align=right | 1.8 km || 
|-id=614 bgcolor=#fefefe
| 183614 ||  || — || October 21, 2003 || Kitt Peak || Spacewatch || — || align=right | 1.5 km || 
|-id=615 bgcolor=#fefefe
| 183615 ||  || — || October 21, 2003 || Kitt Peak || Spacewatch || — || align=right | 1.4 km || 
|-id=616 bgcolor=#fefefe
| 183616 ||  || — || October 23, 2003 || Haleakala || NEAT || NYS || align=right | 1.0 km || 
|-id=617 bgcolor=#fefefe
| 183617 ||  || — || October 21, 2003 || Socorro || LINEAR || FLO || align=right data-sort-value="0.79" | 790 m || 
|-id=618 bgcolor=#fefefe
| 183618 ||  || — || October 22, 2003 || Kitt Peak || Spacewatch || NYS || align=right data-sort-value="0.97" | 970 m || 
|-id=619 bgcolor=#fefefe
| 183619 ||  || — || October 23, 2003 || Anderson Mesa || LONEOS || — || align=right data-sort-value="0.81" | 810 m || 
|-id=620 bgcolor=#fefefe
| 183620 ||  || — || October 23, 2003 || Anderson Mesa || LONEOS || NYS || align=right data-sort-value="0.98" | 980 m || 
|-id=621 bgcolor=#fefefe
| 183621 ||  || — || October 24, 2003 || Socorro || LINEAR || FLO || align=right data-sort-value="0.81" | 810 m || 
|-id=622 bgcolor=#fefefe
| 183622 ||  || — || October 24, 2003 || Socorro || LINEAR || — || align=right data-sort-value="0.94" | 940 m || 
|-id=623 bgcolor=#fefefe
| 183623 ||  || — || October 25, 2003 || Socorro || LINEAR || NYS || align=right data-sort-value="0.83" | 830 m || 
|-id=624 bgcolor=#E9E9E9
| 183624 ||  || — || October 25, 2003 || Socorro || LINEAR || — || align=right | 4.7 km || 
|-id=625 bgcolor=#fefefe
| 183625 ||  || — || October 27, 2003 || Kitt Peak || Spacewatch || ERI || align=right | 2.0 km || 
|-id=626 bgcolor=#fefefe
| 183626 ||  || — || October 28, 2003 || Socorro || LINEAR || MAS || align=right | 1.1 km || 
|-id=627 bgcolor=#E9E9E9
| 183627 ||  || — || October 30, 2003 || Socorro || LINEAR || — || align=right | 1.4 km || 
|-id=628 bgcolor=#fefefe
| 183628 ||  || — || October 18, 2003 || Anderson Mesa || LONEOS || — || align=right | 1.0 km || 
|-id=629 bgcolor=#fefefe
| 183629 ||  || — || October 19, 2003 || Kitt Peak || Spacewatch || — || align=right | 1.0 km || 
|-id=630 bgcolor=#E9E9E9
| 183630 ||  || — || October 19, 2003 || Kitt Peak || Spacewatch || — || align=right | 1.2 km || 
|-id=631 bgcolor=#fefefe
| 183631 ||  || — || October 22, 2003 || Apache Point || SDSS || — || align=right | 1.2 km || 
|-id=632 bgcolor=#E9E9E9
| 183632 ||  || — || October 22, 2003 || Apache Point || SDSS || — || align=right | 1.3 km || 
|-id=633 bgcolor=#fefefe
| 183633 ||  || — || October 23, 2003 || Apache Point || SDSS || NYS || align=right data-sort-value="0.92" | 920 m || 
|-id=634 bgcolor=#fefefe
| 183634 ||  || — || October 23, 2003 || Apache Point || SDSS || MAS || align=right data-sort-value="0.75" | 750 m || 
|-id=635 bgcolor=#fefefe
| 183635 Helmi ||  ||  || October 24, 2003 || Apache Point || SDSS || NYS || align=right | 1.2 km || 
|-id=636 bgcolor=#fefefe
| 183636 || 2003 VV || — || November 5, 2003 || Socorro || LINEAR || — || align=right | 2.2 km || 
|-id=637 bgcolor=#fefefe
| 183637 ||  || — || November 15, 2003 || Kitt Peak || Spacewatch || FLO || align=right data-sort-value="0.73" | 730 m || 
|-id=638 bgcolor=#fefefe
| 183638 ||  || — || November 19, 2003 || Kitt Peak || Spacewatch || FLO || align=right data-sort-value="0.97" | 970 m || 
|-id=639 bgcolor=#fefefe
| 183639 ||  || — || November 20, 2003 || Socorro || LINEAR || — || align=right data-sort-value="0.98" | 980 m || 
|-id=640 bgcolor=#fefefe
| 183640 ||  || — || November 19, 2003 || Socorro || LINEAR || — || align=right data-sort-value="0.96" | 960 m || 
|-id=641 bgcolor=#fefefe
| 183641 ||  || — || November 16, 2003 || Kitt Peak || Spacewatch || — || align=right | 1.2 km || 
|-id=642 bgcolor=#fefefe
| 183642 ||  || — || November 20, 2003 || Socorro || LINEAR || — || align=right | 1.2 km || 
|-id=643 bgcolor=#fefefe
| 183643 ||  || — || November 20, 2003 || Socorro || LINEAR || — || align=right data-sort-value="0.97" | 970 m || 
|-id=644 bgcolor=#fefefe
| 183644 ||  || — || November 18, 2003 || Kitt Peak || Spacewatch || MAS || align=right | 1.0 km || 
|-id=645 bgcolor=#fefefe
| 183645 ||  || — || November 18, 2003 || Palomar || NEAT || — || align=right | 1.4 km || 
|-id=646 bgcolor=#fefefe
| 183646 ||  || — || November 19, 2003 || Kitt Peak || Spacewatch || — || align=right | 1.0 km || 
|-id=647 bgcolor=#fefefe
| 183647 ||  || — || November 19, 2003 || Kitt Peak || Spacewatch || MAS || align=right data-sort-value="0.91" | 910 m || 
|-id=648 bgcolor=#fefefe
| 183648 ||  || — || November 19, 2003 || Kitt Peak || Spacewatch || NYS || align=right data-sort-value="0.98" | 980 m || 
|-id=649 bgcolor=#fefefe
| 183649 ||  || — || November 19, 2003 || Kitt Peak || Spacewatch || — || align=right | 1.3 km || 
|-id=650 bgcolor=#fefefe
| 183650 ||  || — || November 18, 2003 || Kitt Peak || Spacewatch || — || align=right | 1.0 km || 
|-id=651 bgcolor=#fefefe
| 183651 ||  || — || November 16, 2003 || Catalina || CSS || — || align=right | 1.0 km || 
|-id=652 bgcolor=#fefefe
| 183652 ||  || — || November 18, 2003 || Kitt Peak || Spacewatch || V || align=right data-sort-value="0.98" | 980 m || 
|-id=653 bgcolor=#fefefe
| 183653 ||  || — || November 19, 2003 || Anderson Mesa || LONEOS || — || align=right | 1.1 km || 
|-id=654 bgcolor=#fefefe
| 183654 ||  || — || November 19, 2003 || Anderson Mesa || LONEOS || — || align=right data-sort-value="0.90" | 900 m || 
|-id=655 bgcolor=#E9E9E9
| 183655 ||  || — || November 21, 2003 || Socorro || LINEAR || — || align=right | 2.4 km || 
|-id=656 bgcolor=#fefefe
| 183656 ||  || — || November 20, 2003 || Socorro || LINEAR || NYS || align=right data-sort-value="0.73" | 730 m || 
|-id=657 bgcolor=#fefefe
| 183657 ||  || — || November 20, 2003 || Socorro || LINEAR || — || align=right | 1.1 km || 
|-id=658 bgcolor=#E9E9E9
| 183658 ||  || — || November 20, 2003 || Socorro || LINEAR || — || align=right | 1.8 km || 
|-id=659 bgcolor=#fefefe
| 183659 ||  || — || November 20, 2003 || Socorro || LINEAR || — || align=right | 1.3 km || 
|-id=660 bgcolor=#fefefe
| 183660 ||  || — || November 20, 2003 || Socorro || LINEAR || — || align=right data-sort-value="0.95" | 950 m || 
|-id=661 bgcolor=#fefefe
| 183661 ||  || — || November 20, 2003 || Socorro || LINEAR || — || align=right | 1.1 km || 
|-id=662 bgcolor=#E9E9E9
| 183662 ||  || — || November 20, 2003 || Socorro || LINEAR || — || align=right | 6.0 km || 
|-id=663 bgcolor=#fefefe
| 183663 ||  || — || November 21, 2003 || Socorro || LINEAR || PHO || align=right | 3.6 km || 
|-id=664 bgcolor=#fefefe
| 183664 ||  || — || November 21, 2003 || Kitt Peak || Spacewatch || FLO || align=right data-sort-value="0.84" | 840 m || 
|-id=665 bgcolor=#fefefe
| 183665 ||  || — || November 21, 2003 || Palomar || NEAT || — || align=right | 1.0 km || 
|-id=666 bgcolor=#fefefe
| 183666 ||  || — || November 21, 2003 || Socorro || LINEAR || FLO || align=right data-sort-value="0.71" | 710 m || 
|-id=667 bgcolor=#fefefe
| 183667 ||  || — || November 21, 2003 || Socorro || LINEAR || — || align=right | 1.0 km || 
|-id=668 bgcolor=#E9E9E9
| 183668 ||  || — || November 21, 2003 || Socorro || LINEAR || — || align=right | 1.5 km || 
|-id=669 bgcolor=#fefefe
| 183669 ||  || — || November 21, 2003 || Socorro || LINEAR || — || align=right | 1.1 km || 
|-id=670 bgcolor=#fefefe
| 183670 ||  || — || November 21, 2003 || Socorro || LINEAR || — || align=right | 1.3 km || 
|-id=671 bgcolor=#fefefe
| 183671 ||  || — || November 21, 2003 || Socorro || LINEAR || — || align=right | 1.2 km || 
|-id=672 bgcolor=#fefefe
| 183672 ||  || — || November 24, 2003 || Anderson Mesa || LONEOS || — || align=right | 1.0 km || 
|-id=673 bgcolor=#E9E9E9
| 183673 ||  || — || November 21, 2003 || Socorro || LINEAR || — || align=right | 2.1 km || 
|-id=674 bgcolor=#fefefe
| 183674 ||  || — || December 1, 2003 || Socorro || LINEAR || FLO || align=right | 1.1 km || 
|-id=675 bgcolor=#fefefe
| 183675 ||  || — || December 13, 2003 || Socorro || LINEAR || PHO || align=right | 1.8 km || 
|-id=676 bgcolor=#E9E9E9
| 183676 ||  || — || December 14, 2003 || Palomar || NEAT || — || align=right | 1.6 km || 
|-id=677 bgcolor=#fefefe
| 183677 ||  || — || December 1, 2003 || Socorro || LINEAR || FLO || align=right data-sort-value="0.77" | 770 m || 
|-id=678 bgcolor=#fefefe
| 183678 ||  || — || December 1, 2003 || Kitt Peak || Spacewatch || MAS || align=right data-sort-value="0.72" | 720 m || 
|-id=679 bgcolor=#fefefe
| 183679 ||  || — || December 3, 2003 || Socorro || LINEAR || — || align=right | 1.1 km || 
|-id=680 bgcolor=#E9E9E9
| 183680 ||  || — || December 14, 2003 || Kitt Peak || Spacewatch || EUN || align=right | 2.4 km || 
|-id=681 bgcolor=#fefefe
| 183681 || 2003 YO || — || December 16, 2003 || Anderson Mesa || LONEOS || — || align=right | 1.8 km || 
|-id=682 bgcolor=#fefefe
| 183682 ||  || — || December 18, 2003 || Socorro || LINEAR || FLO || align=right | 1.1 km || 
|-id=683 bgcolor=#fefefe
| 183683 ||  || — || December 17, 2003 || Socorro || LINEAR || — || align=right | 1.3 km || 
|-id=684 bgcolor=#fefefe
| 183684 ||  || — || December 16, 2003 || Kitt Peak || Spacewatch || NYS || align=right data-sort-value="0.96" | 960 m || 
|-id=685 bgcolor=#E9E9E9
| 183685 ||  || — || December 17, 2003 || Socorro || LINEAR || — || align=right | 4.8 km || 
|-id=686 bgcolor=#fefefe
| 183686 ||  || — || December 17, 2003 || Catalina || CSS || — || align=right | 1.4 km || 
|-id=687 bgcolor=#fefefe
| 183687 ||  || — || December 17, 2003 || Socorro || LINEAR || — || align=right data-sort-value="0.93" | 930 m || 
|-id=688 bgcolor=#fefefe
| 183688 ||  || — || December 17, 2003 || Kitt Peak || Spacewatch || — || align=right | 1.4 km || 
|-id=689 bgcolor=#fefefe
| 183689 ||  || — || December 16, 2003 || Catalina || CSS || MAS || align=right | 1.0 km || 
|-id=690 bgcolor=#fefefe
| 183690 ||  || — || December 18, 2003 || Socorro || LINEAR || — || align=right | 1.3 km || 
|-id=691 bgcolor=#fefefe
| 183691 ||  || — || December 18, 2003 || Socorro || LINEAR || — || align=right | 2.0 km || 
|-id=692 bgcolor=#fefefe
| 183692 ||  || — || December 18, 2003 || Socorro || LINEAR || — || align=right | 1.4 km || 
|-id=693 bgcolor=#fefefe
| 183693 ||  || — || December 17, 2003 || Kitt Peak || Spacewatch || MAS || align=right data-sort-value="0.95" | 950 m || 
|-id=694 bgcolor=#fefefe
| 183694 ||  || — || December 17, 2003 || Kitt Peak || Spacewatch || MAS || align=right | 1.0 km || 
|-id=695 bgcolor=#E9E9E9
| 183695 ||  || — || December 18, 2003 || Socorro || LINEAR || — || align=right | 2.6 km || 
|-id=696 bgcolor=#fefefe
| 183696 ||  || — || December 18, 2003 || Socorro || LINEAR || — || align=right | 1.0 km || 
|-id=697 bgcolor=#fefefe
| 183697 ||  || — || December 18, 2003 || Kitt Peak || Spacewatch || FLO || align=right data-sort-value="0.94" | 940 m || 
|-id=698 bgcolor=#fefefe
| 183698 ||  || — || December 18, 2003 || Haleakala || NEAT || — || align=right | 1.3 km || 
|-id=699 bgcolor=#fefefe
| 183699 ||  || — || December 18, 2003 || Haleakala || NEAT || — || align=right | 1.2 km || 
|-id=700 bgcolor=#fefefe
| 183700 ||  || — || December 18, 2003 || Socorro || LINEAR || — || align=right | 1.2 km || 
|}

183701–183800 

|-bgcolor=#fefefe
| 183701 ||  || — || December 21, 2003 || Socorro || LINEAR || — || align=right | 1.0 km || 
|-id=702 bgcolor=#fefefe
| 183702 ||  || — || December 17, 2003 || Kitt Peak || Spacewatch || NYS || align=right data-sort-value="0.87" | 870 m || 
|-id=703 bgcolor=#E9E9E9
| 183703 ||  || — || December 19, 2003 || Kitt Peak || Spacewatch || — || align=right | 1.1 km || 
|-id=704 bgcolor=#fefefe
| 183704 ||  || — || December 20, 2003 || Socorro || LINEAR || PHO || align=right | 1.8 km || 
|-id=705 bgcolor=#fefefe
| 183705 ||  || — || December 18, 2003 || Socorro || LINEAR || — || align=right data-sort-value="0.90" | 900 m || 
|-id=706 bgcolor=#fefefe
| 183706 ||  || — || December 18, 2003 || Socorro || LINEAR || NYS || align=right | 1.1 km || 
|-id=707 bgcolor=#fefefe
| 183707 ||  || — || December 18, 2003 || Socorro || LINEAR || NYS || align=right | 1.00 km || 
|-id=708 bgcolor=#fefefe
| 183708 ||  || — || December 18, 2003 || Socorro || LINEAR || V || align=right | 1.0 km || 
|-id=709 bgcolor=#E9E9E9
| 183709 ||  || — || December 19, 2003 || Socorro || LINEAR || — || align=right | 1.3 km || 
|-id=710 bgcolor=#fefefe
| 183710 ||  || — || December 19, 2003 || Socorro || LINEAR || — || align=right | 1.0 km || 
|-id=711 bgcolor=#fefefe
| 183711 ||  || — || December 19, 2003 || Socorro || LINEAR || NYS || align=right | 1.1 km || 
|-id=712 bgcolor=#fefefe
| 183712 ||  || — || December 19, 2003 || Socorro || LINEAR || FLO || align=right | 1.1 km || 
|-id=713 bgcolor=#fefefe
| 183713 ||  || — || December 19, 2003 || Socorro || LINEAR || NYS || align=right | 1.2 km || 
|-id=714 bgcolor=#fefefe
| 183714 ||  || — || December 19, 2003 || Socorro || LINEAR || — || align=right | 1.3 km || 
|-id=715 bgcolor=#fefefe
| 183715 ||  || — || December 18, 2003 || Socorro || LINEAR || V || align=right | 1.1 km || 
|-id=716 bgcolor=#fefefe
| 183716 ||  || — || December 18, 2003 || Socorro || LINEAR || NYS || align=right data-sort-value="0.90" | 900 m || 
|-id=717 bgcolor=#E9E9E9
| 183717 ||  || — || December 18, 2003 || Socorro || LINEAR || — || align=right | 1.4 km || 
|-id=718 bgcolor=#fefefe
| 183718 ||  || — || December 18, 2003 || Socorro || LINEAR || — || align=right | 1.2 km || 
|-id=719 bgcolor=#fefefe
| 183719 ||  || — || December 18, 2003 || Socorro || LINEAR || NYS || align=right data-sort-value="0.96" | 960 m || 
|-id=720 bgcolor=#fefefe
| 183720 ||  || — || December 18, 2003 || Kitt Peak || Spacewatch || — || align=right data-sort-value="0.99" | 990 m || 
|-id=721 bgcolor=#E9E9E9
| 183721 ||  || — || December 19, 2003 || Socorro || LINEAR || — || align=right | 2.9 km || 
|-id=722 bgcolor=#fefefe
| 183722 ||  || — || December 19, 2003 || Kitt Peak || Spacewatch || NYS || align=right data-sort-value="0.84" | 840 m || 
|-id=723 bgcolor=#fefefe
| 183723 ||  || — || December 19, 2003 || Socorro || LINEAR || V || align=right | 1.0 km || 
|-id=724 bgcolor=#fefefe
| 183724 ||  || — || December 19, 2003 || Socorro || LINEAR || — || align=right | 1.9 km || 
|-id=725 bgcolor=#fefefe
| 183725 ||  || — || December 19, 2003 || Kitt Peak || Spacewatch || — || align=right | 1.4 km || 
|-id=726 bgcolor=#fefefe
| 183726 ||  || — || December 19, 2003 || Socorro || LINEAR || — || align=right data-sort-value="0.93" | 930 m || 
|-id=727 bgcolor=#fefefe
| 183727 ||  || — || December 19, 2003 || Socorro || LINEAR || — || align=right | 1.2 km || 
|-id=728 bgcolor=#fefefe
| 183728 ||  || — || December 19, 2003 || Socorro || LINEAR || NYS || align=right | 1.3 km || 
|-id=729 bgcolor=#fefefe
| 183729 ||  || — || December 19, 2003 || Socorro || LINEAR || — || align=right | 1.2 km || 
|-id=730 bgcolor=#fefefe
| 183730 ||  || — || December 19, 2003 || Socorro || LINEAR || NYS || align=right data-sort-value="0.99" | 990 m || 
|-id=731 bgcolor=#fefefe
| 183731 ||  || — || December 19, 2003 || Socorro || LINEAR || — || align=right | 1.2 km || 
|-id=732 bgcolor=#fefefe
| 183732 ||  || — || December 19, 2003 || Socorro || LINEAR || — || align=right | 1.1 km || 
|-id=733 bgcolor=#fefefe
| 183733 ||  || — || December 21, 2003 || Kitt Peak || Spacewatch || FLO || align=right data-sort-value="0.96" | 960 m || 
|-id=734 bgcolor=#fefefe
| 183734 ||  || — || December 22, 2003 || Palomar || NEAT || NYS || align=right data-sort-value="0.99" | 990 m || 
|-id=735 bgcolor=#fefefe
| 183735 ||  || — || December 23, 2003 || Socorro || LINEAR || ERI || align=right | 3.2 km || 
|-id=736 bgcolor=#fefefe
| 183736 ||  || — || December 23, 2003 || Socorro || LINEAR || — || align=right data-sort-value="0.98" | 980 m || 
|-id=737 bgcolor=#fefefe
| 183737 ||  || — || December 23, 2003 || Socorro || LINEAR || FLO || align=right data-sort-value="0.97" | 970 m || 
|-id=738 bgcolor=#fefefe
| 183738 ||  || — || December 23, 2003 || Socorro || LINEAR || — || align=right | 1.4 km || 
|-id=739 bgcolor=#fefefe
| 183739 ||  || — || December 27, 2003 || Socorro || LINEAR || — || align=right | 1.0 km || 
|-id=740 bgcolor=#fefefe
| 183740 ||  || — || December 27, 2003 || Socorro || LINEAR || — || align=right | 1.3 km || 
|-id=741 bgcolor=#fefefe
| 183741 ||  || — || December 27, 2003 || Socorro || LINEAR || NYS || align=right data-sort-value="0.90" | 900 m || 
|-id=742 bgcolor=#fefefe
| 183742 ||  || — || December 27, 2003 || Socorro || LINEAR || — || align=right | 1.2 km || 
|-id=743 bgcolor=#E9E9E9
| 183743 ||  || — || December 27, 2003 || Socorro || LINEAR || — || align=right | 3.8 km || 
|-id=744 bgcolor=#fefefe
| 183744 ||  || — || December 28, 2003 || Socorro || LINEAR || — || align=right | 1.3 km || 
|-id=745 bgcolor=#fefefe
| 183745 ||  || — || December 28, 2003 || Socorro || LINEAR || — || align=right | 1.2 km || 
|-id=746 bgcolor=#fefefe
| 183746 ||  || — || December 27, 2003 || Socorro || LINEAR || NYS || align=right | 1.0 km || 
|-id=747 bgcolor=#fefefe
| 183747 ||  || — || December 28, 2003 || Socorro || LINEAR || NYS || align=right data-sort-value="0.88" | 880 m || 
|-id=748 bgcolor=#E9E9E9
| 183748 ||  || — || December 29, 2003 || Catalina || CSS || — || align=right | 2.3 km || 
|-id=749 bgcolor=#fefefe
| 183749 ||  || — || December 16, 2003 || Kitt Peak || Spacewatch || NYS || align=right data-sort-value="0.88" | 880 m || 
|-id=750 bgcolor=#fefefe
| 183750 ||  || — || December 17, 2003 || Kitt Peak || Spacewatch || V || align=right data-sort-value="0.89" | 890 m || 
|-id=751 bgcolor=#E9E9E9
| 183751 ||  || — || December 18, 2003 || Socorro || LINEAR || — || align=right | 4.4 km || 
|-id=752 bgcolor=#fefefe
| 183752 ||  || — || December 29, 2003 || Socorro || LINEAR || FLO || align=right data-sort-value="0.85" | 850 m || 
|-id=753 bgcolor=#fefefe
| 183753 ||  || — || January 12, 2004 || Palomar || NEAT || MAS || align=right | 1.3 km || 
|-id=754 bgcolor=#fefefe
| 183754 ||  || — || January 12, 2004 || Palomar || NEAT || FLO || align=right | 1.3 km || 
|-id=755 bgcolor=#fefefe
| 183755 ||  || — || January 13, 2004 || Anderson Mesa || LONEOS || — || align=right | 1.5 km || 
|-id=756 bgcolor=#fefefe
| 183756 ||  || — || January 13, 2004 || Anderson Mesa || LONEOS || — || align=right | 1.2 km || 
|-id=757 bgcolor=#fefefe
| 183757 ||  || — || January 13, 2004 || Palomar || NEAT || — || align=right | 1.8 km || 
|-id=758 bgcolor=#E9E9E9
| 183758 ||  || — || January 14, 2004 || Palomar || NEAT || — || align=right | 1.9 km || 
|-id=759 bgcolor=#fefefe
| 183759 ||  || — || January 15, 2004 || Kitt Peak || Spacewatch || — || align=right data-sort-value="0.85" | 850 m || 
|-id=760 bgcolor=#fefefe
| 183760 ||  || — || January 15, 2004 || Kitt Peak || Spacewatch || NYS || align=right | 1.1 km || 
|-id=761 bgcolor=#E9E9E9
| 183761 ||  || — || January 13, 2004 || Kitt Peak || Spacewatch || — || align=right | 1.2 km || 
|-id=762 bgcolor=#fefefe
| 183762 ||  || — || January 15, 2004 || Kitt Peak || Spacewatch || FLO || align=right data-sort-value="0.95" | 950 m || 
|-id=763 bgcolor=#E9E9E9
| 183763 ||  || — || January 12, 2004 || Palomar || NEAT || — || align=right | 2.5 km || 
|-id=764 bgcolor=#fefefe
| 183764 ||  || — || January 16, 2004 || Kitt Peak || Spacewatch || — || align=right | 1.2 km || 
|-id=765 bgcolor=#fefefe
| 183765 ||  || — || January 16, 2004 || Palomar || NEAT || — || align=right | 1.2 km || 
|-id=766 bgcolor=#fefefe
| 183766 ||  || — || January 16, 2004 || Palomar || NEAT || NYS || align=right data-sort-value="0.79" | 790 m || 
|-id=767 bgcolor=#fefefe
| 183767 ||  || — || January 16, 2004 || Palomar || NEAT || NYS || align=right data-sort-value="0.83" | 830 m || 
|-id=768 bgcolor=#fefefe
| 183768 ||  || — || January 16, 2004 || Palomar || NEAT || NYS || align=right data-sort-value="0.88" | 880 m || 
|-id=769 bgcolor=#E9E9E9
| 183769 ||  || — || January 16, 2004 || Palomar || NEAT || GEF || align=right | 2.2 km || 
|-id=770 bgcolor=#fefefe
| 183770 ||  || — || January 16, 2004 || Palomar || NEAT || V || align=right | 1.2 km || 
|-id=771 bgcolor=#fefefe
| 183771 ||  || — || January 16, 2004 || Palomar || NEAT || — || align=right | 1.1 km || 
|-id=772 bgcolor=#fefefe
| 183772 ||  || — || January 17, 2004 || Palomar || NEAT || MAS || align=right | 1.0 km || 
|-id=773 bgcolor=#E9E9E9
| 183773 ||  || — || January 18, 2004 || Kitt Peak || Spacewatch || — || align=right | 1.4 km || 
|-id=774 bgcolor=#E9E9E9
| 183774 ||  || — || January 18, 2004 || Goodricke-Pigott || R. A. Tucker || JUN || align=right | 1.6 km || 
|-id=775 bgcolor=#fefefe
| 183775 ||  || — || January 17, 2004 || Palomar || NEAT || FLO || align=right | 1.1 km || 
|-id=776 bgcolor=#fefefe
| 183776 ||  || — || January 17, 2004 || Palomar || NEAT || FLO || align=right | 1.1 km || 
|-id=777 bgcolor=#fefefe
| 183777 ||  || — || January 17, 2004 || Palomar || NEAT || — || align=right | 1.2 km || 
|-id=778 bgcolor=#fefefe
| 183778 ||  || — || January 17, 2004 || Palomar || NEAT || V || align=right | 1.1 km || 
|-id=779 bgcolor=#fefefe
| 183779 ||  || — || January 16, 2004 || Catalina || CSS || — || align=right | 1.1 km || 
|-id=780 bgcolor=#E9E9E9
| 183780 ||  || — || January 19, 2004 || Socorro || LINEAR || — || align=right | 3.3 km || 
|-id=781 bgcolor=#fefefe
| 183781 ||  || — || January 17, 2004 || Palomar || NEAT || MAS || align=right | 1.0 km || 
|-id=782 bgcolor=#fefefe
| 183782 ||  || — || January 18, 2004 || Palomar || NEAT || — || align=right | 1.1 km || 
|-id=783 bgcolor=#fefefe
| 183783 ||  || — || January 21, 2004 || Socorro || LINEAR || — || align=right | 1.1 km || 
|-id=784 bgcolor=#fefefe
| 183784 ||  || — || January 18, 2004 || Palomar || NEAT || — || align=right | 1.2 km || 
|-id=785 bgcolor=#fefefe
| 183785 ||  || — || January 18, 2004 || Palomar || NEAT || — || align=right | 1.2 km || 
|-id=786 bgcolor=#fefefe
| 183786 ||  || — || January 18, 2004 || Palomar || NEAT || NYS || align=right data-sort-value="0.79" | 790 m || 
|-id=787 bgcolor=#E9E9E9
| 183787 ||  || — || January 18, 2004 || Palomar || NEAT || — || align=right | 1.1 km || 
|-id=788 bgcolor=#fefefe
| 183788 ||  || — || January 19, 2004 || Kitt Peak || Spacewatch || — || align=right | 1.2 km || 
|-id=789 bgcolor=#fefefe
| 183789 ||  || — || January 19, 2004 || Kitt Peak || Spacewatch || — || align=right | 1.2 km || 
|-id=790 bgcolor=#fefefe
| 183790 ||  || — || January 19, 2004 || Catalina || CSS || — || align=right | 1.1 km || 
|-id=791 bgcolor=#fefefe
| 183791 ||  || — || January 19, 2004 || Catalina || CSS || NYS || align=right | 1.1 km || 
|-id=792 bgcolor=#E9E9E9
| 183792 ||  || — || January 19, 2004 || Catalina || CSS || HNS || align=right | 1.8 km || 
|-id=793 bgcolor=#fefefe
| 183793 ||  || — || January 19, 2004 || Catalina || CSS || MAS || align=right | 1.1 km || 
|-id=794 bgcolor=#fefefe
| 183794 ||  || — || January 19, 2004 || Catalina || CSS || NYS || align=right data-sort-value="0.92" | 920 m || 
|-id=795 bgcolor=#fefefe
| 183795 ||  || — || January 19, 2004 || Catalina || CSS || NYS || align=right | 1.1 km || 
|-id=796 bgcolor=#fefefe
| 183796 ||  || — || January 20, 2004 || Socorro || LINEAR || MAS || align=right data-sort-value="0.82" | 820 m || 
|-id=797 bgcolor=#E9E9E9
| 183797 ||  || — || January 20, 2004 || Socorro || LINEAR || — || align=right | 2.6 km || 
|-id=798 bgcolor=#fefefe
| 183798 ||  || — || January 21, 2004 || Socorro || LINEAR || NYS || align=right | 3.7 km || 
|-id=799 bgcolor=#fefefe
| 183799 ||  || — || January 21, 2004 || Socorro || LINEAR || NYS || align=right data-sort-value="0.98" | 980 m || 
|-id=800 bgcolor=#fefefe
| 183800 ||  || — || January 21, 2004 || Socorro || LINEAR || V || align=right | 1.1 km || 
|}

183801–183900 

|-bgcolor=#fefefe
| 183801 ||  || — || January 21, 2004 || Socorro || LINEAR || NYS || align=right data-sort-value="0.81" | 810 m || 
|-id=802 bgcolor=#fefefe
| 183802 ||  || — || January 21, 2004 || Socorro || LINEAR || MAS || align=right data-sort-value="0.92" | 920 m || 
|-id=803 bgcolor=#fefefe
| 183803 ||  || — || January 22, 2004 || Palomar || NEAT || ERI || align=right | 2.4 km || 
|-id=804 bgcolor=#fefefe
| 183804 ||  || — || January 22, 2004 || Socorro || LINEAR || MAS || align=right | 1.1 km || 
|-id=805 bgcolor=#fefefe
| 183805 ||  || — || January 22, 2004 || Socorro || LINEAR || — || align=right | 1.2 km || 
|-id=806 bgcolor=#fefefe
| 183806 ||  || — || January 21, 2004 || Socorro || LINEAR || — || align=right | 1.4 km || 
|-id=807 bgcolor=#E9E9E9
| 183807 ||  || — || January 21, 2004 || Socorro || LINEAR || — || align=right | 1.5 km || 
|-id=808 bgcolor=#fefefe
| 183808 ||  || — || January 21, 2004 || Socorro || LINEAR || — || align=right | 1.2 km || 
|-id=809 bgcolor=#fefefe
| 183809 ||  || — || January 22, 2004 || Socorro || LINEAR || — || align=right data-sort-value="0.92" | 920 m || 
|-id=810 bgcolor=#E9E9E9
| 183810 ||  || — || January 21, 2004 || Socorro || LINEAR || MAR || align=right | 1.4 km || 
|-id=811 bgcolor=#fefefe
| 183811 ||  || — || January 22, 2004 || Socorro || LINEAR || V || align=right | 1.0 km || 
|-id=812 bgcolor=#fefefe
| 183812 ||  || — || January 22, 2004 || Socorro || LINEAR || — || align=right | 1.1 km || 
|-id=813 bgcolor=#fefefe
| 183813 ||  || — || January 22, 2004 || Socorro || LINEAR || MAS || align=right data-sort-value="0.94" | 940 m || 
|-id=814 bgcolor=#E9E9E9
| 183814 ||  || — || January 22, 2004 || Socorro || LINEAR || — || align=right | 1.4 km || 
|-id=815 bgcolor=#fefefe
| 183815 ||  || — || January 22, 2004 || Socorro || LINEAR || FLO || align=right data-sort-value="0.97" | 970 m || 
|-id=816 bgcolor=#fefefe
| 183816 ||  || — || January 22, 2004 || Socorro || LINEAR || NYS || align=right data-sort-value="0.97" | 970 m || 
|-id=817 bgcolor=#fefefe
| 183817 ||  || — || January 22, 2004 || Socorro || LINEAR || — || align=right | 1.4 km || 
|-id=818 bgcolor=#E9E9E9
| 183818 ||  || — || January 24, 2004 || Socorro || LINEAR || — || align=right | 1.8 km || 
|-id=819 bgcolor=#fefefe
| 183819 ||  || — || January 22, 2004 || Socorro || LINEAR || — || align=right | 1.0 km || 
|-id=820 bgcolor=#fefefe
| 183820 ||  || — || January 22, 2004 || Socorro || LINEAR || NYS || align=right data-sort-value="0.76" | 760 m || 
|-id=821 bgcolor=#fefefe
| 183821 ||  || — || January 22, 2004 || Socorro || LINEAR || NYS || align=right data-sort-value="0.93" | 930 m || 
|-id=822 bgcolor=#E9E9E9
| 183822 ||  || — || January 22, 2004 || Socorro || LINEAR || AGN || align=right | 1.6 km || 
|-id=823 bgcolor=#fefefe
| 183823 ||  || — || January 26, 2004 || Anderson Mesa || LONEOS || FLO || align=right | 1.9 km || 
|-id=824 bgcolor=#fefefe
| 183824 ||  || — || January 28, 2004 || Kitt Peak || Spacewatch || NYS || align=right data-sort-value="0.94" | 940 m || 
|-id=825 bgcolor=#E9E9E9
| 183825 ||  || — || January 23, 2004 || Socorro || LINEAR || — || align=right | 1.3 km || 
|-id=826 bgcolor=#fefefe
| 183826 ||  || — || January 26, 2004 || Anderson Mesa || LONEOS || V || align=right | 1.2 km || 
|-id=827 bgcolor=#E9E9E9
| 183827 ||  || — || January 28, 2004 || Socorro || LINEAR || — || align=right | 4.6 km || 
|-id=828 bgcolor=#fefefe
| 183828 ||  || — || January 22, 2004 || Socorro || LINEAR || — || align=right | 1.6 km || 
|-id=829 bgcolor=#fefefe
| 183829 ||  || — || January 24, 2004 || Socorro || LINEAR || NYS || align=right data-sort-value="0.65" | 650 m || 
|-id=830 bgcolor=#fefefe
| 183830 ||  || — || January 24, 2004 || Socorro || LINEAR || MAS || align=right | 1.0 km || 
|-id=831 bgcolor=#fefefe
| 183831 ||  || — || January 24, 2004 || Socorro || LINEAR || — || align=right | 1.1 km || 
|-id=832 bgcolor=#E9E9E9
| 183832 ||  || — || January 27, 2004 || Kitt Peak || Spacewatch || — || align=right | 1.8 km || 
|-id=833 bgcolor=#E9E9E9
| 183833 ||  || — || January 29, 2004 || Socorro || LINEAR || — || align=right | 1.2 km || 
|-id=834 bgcolor=#E9E9E9
| 183834 ||  || — || January 23, 2004 || Socorro || LINEAR || — || align=right | 1.4 km || 
|-id=835 bgcolor=#fefefe
| 183835 ||  || — || January 24, 2004 || Socorro || LINEAR || V || align=right | 1.1 km || 
|-id=836 bgcolor=#fefefe
| 183836 ||  || — || January 24, 2004 || Socorro || LINEAR || MAS || align=right | 1.1 km || 
|-id=837 bgcolor=#fefefe
| 183837 ||  || — || January 28, 2004 || Catalina || CSS || — || align=right | 1.1 km || 
|-id=838 bgcolor=#fefefe
| 183838 ||  || — || January 28, 2004 || Kitt Peak || Spacewatch || — || align=right | 1.3 km || 
|-id=839 bgcolor=#fefefe
| 183839 ||  || — || January 28, 2004 || Kitt Peak || Spacewatch || MAS || align=right data-sort-value="0.86" | 860 m || 
|-id=840 bgcolor=#fefefe
| 183840 ||  || — || January 28, 2004 || Catalina || CSS || V || align=right | 1.1 km || 
|-id=841 bgcolor=#fefefe
| 183841 ||  || — || January 28, 2004 || Catalina || CSS || ERI || align=right | 2.5 km || 
|-id=842 bgcolor=#fefefe
| 183842 ||  || — || January 28, 2004 || Catalina || CSS || — || align=right | 1.5 km || 
|-id=843 bgcolor=#fefefe
| 183843 ||  || — || January 27, 2004 || Kitt Peak || Spacewatch || — || align=right data-sort-value="0.91" | 910 m || 
|-id=844 bgcolor=#E9E9E9
| 183844 ||  || — || January 27, 2004 || Socorro || LINEAR || — || align=right | 3.2 km || 
|-id=845 bgcolor=#fefefe
| 183845 ||  || — || January 29, 2004 || Anderson Mesa || LONEOS || — || align=right | 1.4 km || 
|-id=846 bgcolor=#fefefe
| 183846 ||  || — || January 22, 2004 || Mauna Kea || R. L. Allen || MAS || align=right | 1.0 km || 
|-id=847 bgcolor=#fefefe
| 183847 ||  || — || January 18, 2004 || Palomar || NEAT || — || align=right | 1.1 km || 
|-id=848 bgcolor=#d6d6d6
| 183848 ||  || — || January 16, 2004 || Kitt Peak || Spacewatch || — || align=right | 3.1 km || 
|-id=849 bgcolor=#fefefe
| 183849 ||  || — || January 18, 2004 || Catalina || CSS || — || align=right | 3.4 km || 
|-id=850 bgcolor=#E9E9E9
| 183850 ||  || — || January 22, 2004 || Socorro || LINEAR || HEN || align=right | 1.4 km || 
|-id=851 bgcolor=#fefefe
| 183851 ||  || — || January 16, 2004 || Palomar || NEAT || — || align=right | 1.3 km || 
|-id=852 bgcolor=#E9E9E9
| 183852 ||  || — || January 27, 2004 || Catalina || CSS || — || align=right | 4.0 km || 
|-id=853 bgcolor=#fefefe
| 183853 ||  || — || February 12, 2004 || Goodricke-Pigott || Goodricke-Pigott Obs. || ERI || align=right | 3.0 km || 
|-id=854 bgcolor=#fefefe
| 183854 ||  || — || February 12, 2004 || Desert Eagle || W. K. Y. Yeung || — || align=right | 1.5 km || 
|-id=855 bgcolor=#E9E9E9
| 183855 ||  || — || February 10, 2004 || Palomar || NEAT || — || align=right | 2.6 km || 
|-id=856 bgcolor=#fefefe
| 183856 ||  || — || February 10, 2004 || Catalina || CSS || — || align=right | 1.2 km || 
|-id=857 bgcolor=#fefefe
| 183857 ||  || — || February 10, 2004 || Palomar || NEAT || V || align=right data-sort-value="0.99" | 990 m || 
|-id=858 bgcolor=#fefefe
| 183858 ||  || — || February 10, 2004 || Catalina || CSS || — || align=right | 1.1 km || 
|-id=859 bgcolor=#fefefe
| 183859 ||  || — || February 11, 2004 || Anderson Mesa || LONEOS || NYS || align=right data-sort-value="0.88" | 880 m || 
|-id=860 bgcolor=#fefefe
| 183860 ||  || — || February 11, 2004 || Palomar || NEAT || — || align=right | 1.2 km || 
|-id=861 bgcolor=#fefefe
| 183861 ||  || — || February 11, 2004 || Palomar || NEAT || MAS || align=right | 1.1 km || 
|-id=862 bgcolor=#fefefe
| 183862 ||  || — || February 11, 2004 || Anderson Mesa || LONEOS || NYS || align=right | 1.1 km || 
|-id=863 bgcolor=#fefefe
| 183863 ||  || — || February 11, 2004 || Anderson Mesa || LONEOS || — || align=right | 1.4 km || 
|-id=864 bgcolor=#fefefe
| 183864 ||  || — || February 11, 2004 || Kitt Peak || Spacewatch || NYS || align=right | 1.0 km || 
|-id=865 bgcolor=#fefefe
| 183865 ||  || — || February 11, 2004 || Kitt Peak || Spacewatch || MAS || align=right | 1.2 km || 
|-id=866 bgcolor=#fefefe
| 183866 ||  || — || February 12, 2004 || Kitt Peak || Spacewatch || NYS || align=right data-sort-value="0.87" | 870 m || 
|-id=867 bgcolor=#fefefe
| 183867 ||  || — || February 11, 2004 || Anderson Mesa || LONEOS || NYS || align=right | 1.1 km || 
|-id=868 bgcolor=#fefefe
| 183868 ||  || — || February 11, 2004 || Kitt Peak || Spacewatch || V || align=right | 1.3 km || 
|-id=869 bgcolor=#fefefe
| 183869 ||  || — || February 11, 2004 || Catalina || CSS || NYS || align=right | 1.4 km || 
|-id=870 bgcolor=#fefefe
| 183870 ||  || — || February 12, 2004 || Kitt Peak || Spacewatch || MAS || align=right | 1.2 km || 
|-id=871 bgcolor=#fefefe
| 183871 ||  || — || February 12, 2004 || Kitt Peak || Spacewatch || ERI || align=right | 2.2 km || 
|-id=872 bgcolor=#fefefe
| 183872 ||  || — || February 12, 2004 || Kitt Peak || Spacewatch || NYS || align=right data-sort-value="0.90" | 900 m || 
|-id=873 bgcolor=#fefefe
| 183873 ||  || — || February 11, 2004 || Kitt Peak || Spacewatch || — || align=right | 1.2 km || 
|-id=874 bgcolor=#fefefe
| 183874 ||  || — || February 12, 2004 || Kitt Peak || Spacewatch || FLO || align=right | 1.0 km || 
|-id=875 bgcolor=#E9E9E9
| 183875 ||  || — || February 13, 2004 || Kitt Peak || Spacewatch || — || align=right | 5.4 km || 
|-id=876 bgcolor=#E9E9E9
| 183876 ||  || — || February 15, 2004 || RAS || iTelescope Obs. || — || align=right | 1.8 km || 
|-id=877 bgcolor=#d6d6d6
| 183877 ||  || — || February 13, 2004 || Palomar || NEAT || — || align=right | 4.5 km || 
|-id=878 bgcolor=#fefefe
| 183878 ||  || — || February 11, 2004 || Kitt Peak || Spacewatch || EUT || align=right | 1.1 km || 
|-id=879 bgcolor=#fefefe
| 183879 ||  || — || February 11, 2004 || Catalina || CSS || NYS || align=right | 1.1 km || 
|-id=880 bgcolor=#d6d6d6
| 183880 ||  || — || February 11, 2004 || Palomar || NEAT || EOS || align=right | 3.0 km || 
|-id=881 bgcolor=#fefefe
| 183881 ||  || — || February 14, 2004 || Socorro || LINEAR || ERI || align=right | 1.8 km || 
|-id=882 bgcolor=#fefefe
| 183882 ||  || — || February 10, 2004 || Palomar || NEAT || V || align=right | 1.1 km || 
|-id=883 bgcolor=#fefefe
| 183883 ||  || — || February 11, 2004 || Palomar || NEAT || V || align=right data-sort-value="0.95" | 950 m || 
|-id=884 bgcolor=#fefefe
| 183884 ||  || — || February 15, 2004 || Socorro || LINEAR || — || align=right | 1.7 km || 
|-id=885 bgcolor=#fefefe
| 183885 ||  || — || February 11, 2004 || Palomar || NEAT || V || align=right data-sort-value="0.99" | 990 m || 
|-id=886 bgcolor=#fefefe
| 183886 ||  || — || February 11, 2004 || Palomar || NEAT || — || align=right | 1.1 km || 
|-id=887 bgcolor=#fefefe
| 183887 ||  || — || February 13, 2004 || Palomar || NEAT || — || align=right | 3.8 km || 
|-id=888 bgcolor=#fefefe
| 183888 ||  || — || February 13, 2004 || Palomar || NEAT || — || align=right | 1.5 km || 
|-id=889 bgcolor=#fefefe
| 183889 ||  || — || February 13, 2004 || Kitt Peak || Spacewatch || — || align=right | 1.6 km || 
|-id=890 bgcolor=#fefefe
| 183890 ||  || — || February 11, 2004 || Kitt Peak || Spacewatch || — || align=right | 1.1 km || 
|-id=891 bgcolor=#fefefe
| 183891 ||  || — || February 11, 2004 || Palomar || NEAT || — || align=right | 1.3 km || 
|-id=892 bgcolor=#fefefe
| 183892 ||  || — || February 11, 2004 || Kitt Peak || Spacewatch || — || align=right | 1.2 km || 
|-id=893 bgcolor=#fefefe
| 183893 ||  || — || February 11, 2004 || Palomar || NEAT || V || align=right data-sort-value="0.86" | 860 m || 
|-id=894 bgcolor=#E9E9E9
| 183894 ||  || — || February 11, 2004 || Palomar || NEAT || — || align=right | 2.7 km || 
|-id=895 bgcolor=#fefefe
| 183895 ||  || — || February 11, 2004 || Palomar || NEAT || NYS || align=right | 1.1 km || 
|-id=896 bgcolor=#fefefe
| 183896 ||  || — || February 11, 2004 || Palomar || NEAT || — || align=right | 1.4 km || 
|-id=897 bgcolor=#fefefe
| 183897 ||  || — || February 11, 2004 || Palomar || NEAT || V || align=right | 1.3 km || 
|-id=898 bgcolor=#E9E9E9
| 183898 ||  || — || February 12, 2004 || Kitt Peak || Spacewatch || — || align=right | 1.1 km || 
|-id=899 bgcolor=#fefefe
| 183899 ||  || — || February 12, 2004 || Kitt Peak || Spacewatch || MAS || align=right data-sort-value="0.92" | 920 m || 
|-id=900 bgcolor=#fefefe
| 183900 ||  || — || February 12, 2004 || Kitt Peak || Spacewatch || — || align=right | 1.1 km || 
|}

183901–184000 

|-bgcolor=#fefefe
| 183901 ||  || — || February 12, 2004 || Kitt Peak || Spacewatch || — || align=right data-sort-value="0.92" | 920 m || 
|-id=902 bgcolor=#d6d6d6
| 183902 ||  || — || February 11, 2004 || Palomar || NEAT || — || align=right | 3.9 km || 
|-id=903 bgcolor=#fefefe
| 183903 ||  || — || February 11, 2004 || Palomar || NEAT || — || align=right | 1.3 km || 
|-id=904 bgcolor=#fefefe
| 183904 ||  || — || February 12, 2004 || Palomar || NEAT || V || align=right data-sort-value="0.99" | 990 m || 
|-id=905 bgcolor=#fefefe
| 183905 ||  || — || February 12, 2004 || Kitt Peak || Spacewatch || V || align=right data-sort-value="0.80" | 800 m || 
|-id=906 bgcolor=#fefefe
| 183906 ||  || — || February 13, 2004 || Desert Eagle || W. K. Y. Yeung || — || align=right | 1.1 km || 
|-id=907 bgcolor=#fefefe
| 183907 ||  || — || February 11, 2004 || Palomar || NEAT || V || align=right | 1.0 km || 
|-id=908 bgcolor=#fefefe
| 183908 ||  || — || February 12, 2004 || Kitt Peak || Spacewatch || NYS || align=right data-sort-value="0.84" | 840 m || 
|-id=909 bgcolor=#fefefe
| 183909 ||  || — || February 12, 2004 || Palomar || NEAT || — || align=right | 1.3 km || 
|-id=910 bgcolor=#fefefe
| 183910 ||  || — || February 15, 2004 || Catalina || CSS || — || align=right | 1.7 km || 
|-id=911 bgcolor=#fefefe
| 183911 ||  || — || February 15, 2004 || Catalina || CSS || CLA || align=right | 3.3 km || 
|-id=912 bgcolor=#fefefe
| 183912 ||  || — || February 15, 2004 || Catalina || CSS || NYS || align=right | 1.1 km || 
|-id=913 bgcolor=#fefefe
| 183913 ||  || — || February 15, 2004 || Catalina || CSS || FLO || align=right | 1.4 km || 
|-id=914 bgcolor=#E9E9E9
| 183914 ||  || — || February 15, 2004 || Catalina || CSS || — || align=right | 2.7 km || 
|-id=915 bgcolor=#fefefe
| 183915 ||  || — || February 12, 2004 || Palomar || NEAT || — || align=right | 1.6 km || 
|-id=916 bgcolor=#fefefe
| 183916 ||  || — || February 12, 2004 || Palomar || NEAT || — || align=right | 1.4 km || 
|-id=917 bgcolor=#fefefe
| 183917 ||  || — || February 13, 2004 || Kitt Peak || Spacewatch || — || align=right | 1.2 km || 
|-id=918 bgcolor=#E9E9E9
| 183918 ||  || — || February 14, 2004 || Kitt Peak || Spacewatch || — || align=right | 1.7 km || 
|-id=919 bgcolor=#E9E9E9
| 183919 ||  || — || February 14, 2004 || Kitt Peak || Spacewatch || — || align=right | 1.5 km || 
|-id=920 bgcolor=#E9E9E9
| 183920 ||  || — || February 11, 2004 || Socorro || LINEAR || MAR || align=right | 1.9 km || 
|-id=921 bgcolor=#d6d6d6
| 183921 ||  || — || February 14, 2004 || Palomar || NEAT || — || align=right | 3.5 km || 
|-id=922 bgcolor=#fefefe
| 183922 ||  || — || February 13, 2004 || Anderson Mesa || LONEOS || V || align=right | 1.0 km || 
|-id=923 bgcolor=#fefefe
| 183923 ||  || — || February 11, 2004 || Palomar || NEAT || — || align=right data-sort-value="0.95" | 950 m || 
|-id=924 bgcolor=#E9E9E9
| 183924 ||  || — || February 12, 2004 || Kitt Peak || Spacewatch || — || align=right | 1.1 km || 
|-id=925 bgcolor=#fefefe
| 183925 ||  || — || February 12, 2004 || Kitt Peak || Spacewatch || NYS || align=right data-sort-value="0.93" | 930 m || 
|-id=926 bgcolor=#fefefe
| 183926 ||  || — || February 13, 2004 || Kitt Peak || Spacewatch || FLO || align=right | 1.1 km || 
|-id=927 bgcolor=#fefefe
| 183927 || 2004 DP || — || February 16, 2004 || Kitt Peak || Spacewatch || NYS || align=right | 1.0 km || 
|-id=928 bgcolor=#E9E9E9
| 183928 ||  || — || February 17, 2004 || Kitt Peak || Spacewatch || — || align=right | 2.8 km || 
|-id=929 bgcolor=#fefefe
| 183929 ||  || — || February 16, 2004 || Kitt Peak || Spacewatch || — || align=right | 1.3 km || 
|-id=930 bgcolor=#fefefe
| 183930 ||  || — || February 16, 2004 || Kitt Peak || Spacewatch || — || align=right | 1.2 km || 
|-id=931 bgcolor=#fefefe
| 183931 ||  || — || February 16, 2004 || Kitt Peak || Spacewatch || MAS || align=right data-sort-value="0.82" | 820 m || 
|-id=932 bgcolor=#fefefe
| 183932 ||  || — || February 16, 2004 || Kitt Peak || Spacewatch || EUT || align=right data-sort-value="0.95" | 950 m || 
|-id=933 bgcolor=#fefefe
| 183933 ||  || — || February 17, 2004 || Socorro || LINEAR || — || align=right | 1.3 km || 
|-id=934 bgcolor=#fefefe
| 183934 ||  || — || February 16, 2004 || Kitt Peak || Spacewatch || — || align=right | 1.2 km || 
|-id=935 bgcolor=#fefefe
| 183935 ||  || — || February 17, 2004 || Socorro || LINEAR || — || align=right | 1.3 km || 
|-id=936 bgcolor=#E9E9E9
| 183936 ||  || — || February 17, 2004 || Catalina || CSS || — || align=right | 1.7 km || 
|-id=937 bgcolor=#E9E9E9
| 183937 ||  || — || February 17, 2004 || Catalina || CSS || — || align=right | 1.6 km || 
|-id=938 bgcolor=#fefefe
| 183938 ||  || — || February 16, 2004 || Socorro || LINEAR || NYS || align=right data-sort-value="0.67" | 670 m || 
|-id=939 bgcolor=#E9E9E9
| 183939 ||  || — || February 16, 2004 || Catalina || CSS || — || align=right | 2.0 km || 
|-id=940 bgcolor=#fefefe
| 183940 ||  || — || February 17, 2004 || Kitt Peak || Spacewatch || — || align=right data-sort-value="0.99" | 990 m || 
|-id=941 bgcolor=#fefefe
| 183941 ||  || — || February 17, 2004 || Socorro || LINEAR || — || align=right | 1.2 km || 
|-id=942 bgcolor=#fefefe
| 183942 ||  || — || February 17, 2004 || Socorro || LINEAR || — || align=right | 1.5 km || 
|-id=943 bgcolor=#fefefe
| 183943 ||  || — || February 18, 2004 || Kitt Peak || Spacewatch || — || align=right | 1.4 km || 
|-id=944 bgcolor=#fefefe
| 183944 ||  || — || February 19, 2004 || Socorro || LINEAR || — || align=right | 1.3 km || 
|-id=945 bgcolor=#fefefe
| 183945 ||  || — || February 19, 2004 || Socorro || LINEAR || NYS || align=right | 1.1 km || 
|-id=946 bgcolor=#d6d6d6
| 183946 ||  || — || February 19, 2004 || Socorro || LINEAR || EOS || align=right | 3.1 km || 
|-id=947 bgcolor=#d6d6d6
| 183947 ||  || — || February 19, 2004 || Socorro || LINEAR || HYG || align=right | 5.0 km || 
|-id=948 bgcolor=#fefefe
| 183948 ||  || — || February 17, 2004 || Kitt Peak || Spacewatch || NYS || align=right | 1.2 km || 
|-id=949 bgcolor=#fefefe
| 183949 ||  || — || February 18, 2004 || Socorro || LINEAR || — || align=right | 1.4 km || 
|-id=950 bgcolor=#fefefe
| 183950 ||  || — || February 22, 2004 || Kitt Peak || Spacewatch || NYS || align=right data-sort-value="0.95" | 950 m || 
|-id=951 bgcolor=#fefefe
| 183951 ||  || — || February 23, 2004 || Socorro || LINEAR || MAS || align=right | 1.2 km || 
|-id=952 bgcolor=#fefefe
| 183952 ||  || — || February 25, 2004 || Nogales || Tenagra II Obs. || NYS || align=right | 1.1 km || 
|-id=953 bgcolor=#fefefe
| 183953 ||  || — || February 19, 2004 || Socorro || LINEAR || — || align=right | 1.4 km || 
|-id=954 bgcolor=#fefefe
| 183954 ||  || — || February 19, 2004 || Socorro || LINEAR || V || align=right data-sort-value="0.90" | 900 m || 
|-id=955 bgcolor=#E9E9E9
| 183955 ||  || — || February 22, 2004 || Kitt Peak || Spacewatch || — || align=right | 1.3 km || 
|-id=956 bgcolor=#fefefe
| 183956 ||  || — || February 24, 2004 || Haleakala || NEAT || — || align=right | 1.2 km || 
|-id=957 bgcolor=#fefefe
| 183957 ||  || — || February 22, 2004 || Kitt Peak || Spacewatch || NYS || align=right data-sort-value="0.97" | 970 m || 
|-id=958 bgcolor=#fefefe
| 183958 ||  || — || February 22, 2004 || Kitt Peak || Spacewatch || NYS || align=right data-sort-value="0.79" | 790 m || 
|-id=959 bgcolor=#fefefe
| 183959 ||  || — || February 25, 2004 || Socorro || LINEAR || — || align=right | 1.3 km || 
|-id=960 bgcolor=#fefefe
| 183960 ||  || — || February 26, 2004 || Socorro || LINEAR || — || align=right | 1.3 km || 
|-id=961 bgcolor=#E9E9E9
| 183961 ||  || — || February 26, 2004 || Socorro || LINEAR || — || align=right | 1.7 km || 
|-id=962 bgcolor=#fefefe
| 183962 ||  || — || February 17, 2004 || Socorro || LINEAR || — || align=right | 2.5 km || 
|-id=963 bgcolor=#C2E0FF
| 183963 ||  || — || February 26, 2004 || Kitt Peak || M. W. Buie || cubewano (cold)critical || align=right | 193 km || 
|-id=964 bgcolor=#C2E0FF
| 183964 ||  || — || February 26, 2004 || Kitt Peak || M. W. Buie || res3:7critical || align=right | 132 km || 
|-id=965 bgcolor=#fefefe
| 183965 ||  || — || February 18, 2004 || Socorro || LINEAR || MAS || align=right | 1.3 km || 
|-id=966 bgcolor=#fefefe
| 183966 ||  || — || March 11, 2004 || Palomar || NEAT || V || align=right | 1.3 km || 
|-id=967 bgcolor=#d6d6d6
| 183967 ||  || — || March 11, 2004 || Palomar || NEAT || THM || align=right | 3.5 km || 
|-id=968 bgcolor=#fefefe
| 183968 ||  || — || March 12, 2004 || Palomar || NEAT || V || align=right | 1.1 km || 
|-id=969 bgcolor=#E9E9E9
| 183969 ||  || — || March 12, 2004 || Palomar || NEAT || — || align=right | 3.6 km || 
|-id=970 bgcolor=#fefefe
| 183970 ||  || — || March 13, 2004 || Palomar || NEAT || — || align=right | 1.7 km || 
|-id=971 bgcolor=#E9E9E9
| 183971 ||  || — || March 13, 2004 || Palomar || NEAT || HNS || align=right | 1.6 km || 
|-id=972 bgcolor=#E9E9E9
| 183972 ||  || — || March 15, 2004 || Desert Eagle || W. K. Y. Yeung || — || align=right | 1.5 km || 
|-id=973 bgcolor=#fefefe
| 183973 ||  || — || March 10, 2004 || Palomar || NEAT || — || align=right | 1.2 km || 
|-id=974 bgcolor=#E9E9E9
| 183974 ||  || — || March 11, 2004 || Palomar || NEAT || — || align=right | 1.7 km || 
|-id=975 bgcolor=#E9E9E9
| 183975 ||  || — || March 12, 2004 || Palomar || NEAT || EUN || align=right | 2.4 km || 
|-id=976 bgcolor=#E9E9E9
| 183976 ||  || — || March 14, 2004 || Kitt Peak || Spacewatch || — || align=right | 1.6 km || 
|-id=977 bgcolor=#fefefe
| 183977 ||  || — || March 15, 2004 || Kitt Peak || Spacewatch || NYS || align=right | 1.1 km || 
|-id=978 bgcolor=#E9E9E9
| 183978 ||  || — || March 15, 2004 || Kitt Peak || Spacewatch || — || align=right | 1.2 km || 
|-id=979 bgcolor=#d6d6d6
| 183979 ||  || — || March 14, 2004 || Palomar || NEAT || EOS || align=right | 4.0 km || 
|-id=980 bgcolor=#fefefe
| 183980 ||  || — || March 13, 2004 || Palomar || NEAT || SUL || align=right | 3.2 km || 
|-id=981 bgcolor=#E9E9E9
| 183981 ||  || — || March 13, 2004 || Palomar || NEAT || — || align=right | 4.3 km || 
|-id=982 bgcolor=#fefefe
| 183982 ||  || — || March 15, 2004 || Kitt Peak || Spacewatch || — || align=right | 1.4 km || 
|-id=983 bgcolor=#E9E9E9
| 183983 ||  || — || March 14, 2004 || Kitt Peak || Spacewatch || — || align=right | 1.4 km || 
|-id=984 bgcolor=#E9E9E9
| 183984 ||  || — || March 15, 2004 || Kitt Peak || Spacewatch || NEM || align=right | 3.1 km || 
|-id=985 bgcolor=#fefefe
| 183985 ||  || — || March 15, 2004 || Socorro || LINEAR || — || align=right | 1.6 km || 
|-id=986 bgcolor=#fefefe
| 183986 ||  || — || March 15, 2004 || Socorro || LINEAR || NYS || align=right data-sort-value="0.88" | 880 m || 
|-id=987 bgcolor=#fefefe
| 183987 ||  || — || March 15, 2004 || Socorro || LINEAR || — || align=right | 1.1 km || 
|-id=988 bgcolor=#fefefe
| 183988 ||  || — || March 15, 2004 || Socorro || LINEAR || V || align=right data-sort-value="0.95" | 950 m || 
|-id=989 bgcolor=#fefefe
| 183989 ||  || — || March 15, 2004 || Socorro || LINEAR || — || align=right | 2.0 km || 
|-id=990 bgcolor=#E9E9E9
| 183990 ||  || — || March 15, 2004 || Socorro || LINEAR || — || align=right | 1.4 km || 
|-id=991 bgcolor=#E9E9E9
| 183991 ||  || — || March 12, 2004 || Palomar || NEAT || — || align=right | 1.4 km || 
|-id=992 bgcolor=#E9E9E9
| 183992 ||  || — || March 15, 2004 || Palomar || NEAT || — || align=right | 1.6 km || 
|-id=993 bgcolor=#E9E9E9
| 183993 ||  || — || March 12, 2004 || Palomar || NEAT || — || align=right | 1.1 km || 
|-id=994 bgcolor=#fefefe
| 183994 ||  || — || March 13, 2004 || Palomar || NEAT || V || align=right | 1.0 km || 
|-id=995 bgcolor=#E9E9E9
| 183995 ||  || — || March 13, 2004 || Palomar || NEAT || — || align=right | 1.3 km || 
|-id=996 bgcolor=#fefefe
| 183996 ||  || — || March 15, 2004 || Kitt Peak || Spacewatch || NYS || align=right data-sort-value="0.78" | 780 m || 
|-id=997 bgcolor=#fefefe
| 183997 ||  || — || March 15, 2004 || Socorro || LINEAR || — || align=right | 1.4 km || 
|-id=998 bgcolor=#E9E9E9
| 183998 ||  || — || March 13, 2004 || Palomar || NEAT || HNS || align=right | 1.9 km || 
|-id=999 bgcolor=#E9E9E9
| 183999 ||  || — || March 15, 2004 || Catalina || CSS || — || align=right | 2.4 km || 
|-id=000 bgcolor=#fefefe
| 184000 ||  || — || March 15, 2004 || Catalina || CSS || — || align=right | 1.1 km || 
|}

References

External links 
 Discovery Circumstances: Numbered Minor Planets (180001)–(185000) (IAU Minor Planet Center)

0183